The following characters are angels of God appearing in the American television series Supernatural.
Angels are portrayed as extremely powerful beings. Merely perceiving their true form - even psychically - typically results in blindness, as the appearance of their natural "visage" is overwhelming; it is capable of burning an individuals eyes from their sockets, although certain "special people" are able to withstand their true appearances and voices. Because their true appearances cannot be safely perceived by humans and because they are spirits with no physical being, they often take on humans as vessels in order to exist in and interact with the physical world, though only with the hosts' consent. Angels require a particular vessel to reach their full potential, people being "chosen" to be their hosts or "true vessels".

Most angels are portrayed as emotionless authoritarian beings. A number have been shown to have disdain for humanity, whom they believe are flawed and inferior creations, though Lucifer is the only angel who refused to kneel before humans at God's command. All angels, fallen or not, consider themselves family, each being brothers and sisters and referring to God as their Father. However, most angels have not actually met or spoken to God. According to Anna Milton, only four angels have actually met God and seen his true face. This number later proves to be false, and six angels are said to have met him - Michael, Gabriel, Raphael, Lucifer, Metatron and Gadreel. This increases to seven after Castiel meets him.The highest-ranking angels currently command the lesser-ranking, their former leader God having disappeared and left the angels to protect humanity in His place.

Series creator Eric Kripke originally did not want angels to be featured in the series, believing God worked through hunters rather than angels. However, with so many demonic villains, he and the writers changed their minds when they realized that the show needed angels to create a "cosmic battle". As Kripke put it, "We had the empire, but we didn't really have the rebellion." They had always wanted to have a storyline with a few central characters but having massive battles in the background, comparable to Star Wars and The Lord of the Rings, and the addition of angels allowed for this. Kripke has found that it has opened up many new storylines.

List

Akobel
Akobel, portrayed by Nils Hognestad, is the Seraphim of the Sixth Choir who married a human, Lily Sunder, in the early twentieth century.

In "Lily Sunder Has Some Regrets," the Winchesters and Castiel investigate a series of angel murders committed by Lily Sunder. Castiel and Ishim, the last two angels left, explain that in 1901, Ishim's garrison, then including Castiel, was ordered to kill Akobel for fathering a Nephilim with Lily Sunder and kill the child, May. When confronted by the angels, Akobel ordered Lily to run and attempted to attack Ishim, but was prevented by Castiel. Restrained by Benjamin and Mirabel, Akobel was executed by Mirabel with an angel blade for his crime and May was then killed by Ishim. In the present day, Lily is seeking revenge upon the angels who killed her family.

After tracking down Lily, the Winchesters learn the truth from her: Akobel was not May's father and she was in fact human. Akobel was protecting Lily's family from Ishim who had become obsessed with her. After she rejected him, Ishim murdered Lily's family in revenge and Lily spent the next century hunting down the angels responsible. During a battle, Ishim is killed by Castiel to save Lily, avenging the murders of Akobel and May. Despite Castiel saving her life, Lily is left unsure if she can forgive him for his role in the events and the remorseful Castiel promises that if she wants revenge again later, he will be waiting for her.

Anael
Anael is an angel who is described as a low-level functionary portrayed by Danneel Ackles, the wife of Jensen Ackles, who plays Dean Winchester.

Anael first appears in "Devil's Bargain" in the guise of her vessel Sister Jo, working as a faith healer. As a faith healer, Anael heals people of their various injuries and ailments in exchange for money. Anael is found by Lucifer who is seeking out angels to drain their grace in order to recharge his own. Recognizing the rogue archangel, Anael instead convinces Lucifer to take bits of her grace, allow her to recharge and then take some more. In this way, Lucifer recharges his grace and forms a relationship with Anael who reveals that she has many plans to remake Heaven for the better, but has never been taken seriously by the other angels. The Winchesters and Castiel eventually track down Anael and Lucifer through Sister Jo's credit cards and Anael pretends to comply with them, claiming that Lucifer is extremely weak. In their motel room, Anael aids Lucifer in fighting the Winchesters and Castiel, flinging Sam into a wall. Before Lucifer can kill them, Arthur Ketch appears and throws a demon bomb, causing Lucifer to grab Anael and teleport away. At Anael's suggestion, Lucifer next visits the Heavenly Portal where he promises to restore the angels' wings and help make new angels if they will bow to him as their undisputed leader. Anael later stands by Lucifer's side as the angels all bow to him in Heaven's Throne Room.

Anael appears in "Bring 'em Back Alive" as Lucifer's second-in-command, growing increasingly frustrated with Lucifer's antics. Lucifer eventually admits to Anael that he lied about being able to restore the angels' wings and make new angels and violently lashes out at her, but cannot bring himself to kill Anael. Completely fed up, Anael tells Lucifer that he now has nothing and has lost her too before leaving him alone. Lucifer subsequently abandons Heaven and Anael who is revealed in "Funeralia" to be one of less than a dozen angels left alive in all of creation.

In Season 14's "Stranger in a Strange Land," Anael, working again as a faith healer on Earth, is approached by the alternate Michael in his search for answers. She later calls Sam to warn him of Michael working with monsters.

In "Game Night," Castiel seeks Anael's help in finding a way to contact God as she was once the protégé of Joshua. Anael reveals a rumor that Joshua managed to contact God after the Fall and helps Castiel search for the method Joshua used. Anael recognizes that Castiel is really trying to find a way to restore Jack's lost soul before he has to tell Sam and Dean about it and explains her reasons for leaving Joshua for her role as a low-level functionary. Though the two angels succeed in finding the copy of Dean's amulet that Joshua constructed, they receive no reply from God and go their separate ways with Castiel planning to finally tell Sam and Dean the truth.

In Season 15's "Destiny's Child," the Winchesters, Castiel and Jack are instructed by Billie to find a mystical object called the Occultum which they track to Anael. Anael reveals that she gave the Occultum to Ruby, supposedly so that the demon could sell it for millions of dollars. However, Dean killed Ruby before she could sell the Occultum and it is currently hidden in Hell. When the Winchesters search Hell, they are ambushed by three demons, but defeat them. Before being killed, the lead demon reveals that Anael hired them to kill Sam and Dean, promising to help the demons escape Hell in exchange. Abandoning her life as a faith healer, Anael flees, telling a man seeking her services to never help one's friends if they ask too much of one. Castiel subsequently enters the Empty to talk to Ruby who reveals that Anael approached her, suggesting that they ride out the Apocalypse inside of the Occultum, the safest place there is. Ruby never told Anael where she hid the Occultum on Earth as she did not trust the angel and reveals where to look in exchange for Castiel promising to try to get the demon out of the Empty.

Anna Milton

Balthazar
Balthazar, portrayed by Sebastian Roché, is an angel who had fought alongside Castiel during the last angelic war. Believed dead, this was merely a cover as he left Heaven, taking a number of the weapons with him. Since faking his own death, he has been on Earth enjoying a rather hedonistic lifestyle. In "The Third Man", the Winchesters discover that three corrupt cops were murdered by the young brother of one of their victims in possession of The Staff of Moses. Balthazar is revealed to have sold it to the boy in return for his soul. During a conflict with Raphael and his henchmen, Balthazar destroys the archangel's vessel with Lot's Salt. Dean then traps Balthazar in a ring of Holy Fire and forces him to give up the boy's soul. They want to get more from him, but Castiel releases him because he owes him his life. Sam uses an Enochian ritual to summon Balthazar, in "Appointment in Samarra". Sam asks him if there is any way to keep a soul out of its body. Balthazar informs him of a ritual that involves him defiling his vessel, his reason for helping Sam being that he would find it useful to have Sam in his debt. He tells Sam that he would need the blood of his father (that need not come from the "father of your blood"), prompting Sam to try to kill Bobby before he is subdued, Dean and Death managing to recover Sam's soul. Balthazar transports Sam and Dean to an alternate universe, in "The French Mistake", to evade the angelic hit man Virgil and gives them a key which he claims opens where the weapons he stole from Heaven are stored. This is revealed to have been a ploy by Balthazar and Castiel to allow the latter to retrieve the weapons from their true location while Raphael was distracted. A suspicious alias used by Balthazar in 1912 leads to the brothers summoning Balthazar in "My Heart Will Go On". Balthazar claims he had saved the Titanic simply because he detested the movie and subsequent eponymous song. However, upon confrontation with Fate, Atropos reveals she knows Balthazar is working for Castiel; the saving of the Titanic was to provide additional souls to fund their side in the civil war. Castiel pulls out of the plan to kill Atropos once she threatens the Winchesters, stopping Balthazar from killing her. When the Winchesters reveal that Castiel is in league with Crowley, in "Let It Bleed", Balthazar agrees to assist the brothers and act as a double agent. He then transports Sam and Dean to where Lisa and Ben are being held captive. In "The Man Who Knew too Much", Balthazar begins to have second thoughts about betraying Castiel, but ultimately continues to assist the brothers. He informs Dean and Bobby of where the ritual to open the gate to Purgatory will take place. Castiel summons Balthazar and reveals that he is aware of his actions, Balthazar is then killed by Castiel.

In Season 13's "Unfinished Business", an alternate reality version of Balthazar is mentioned to have led one of the Apocalypse World Michael's armies. He was killed in battle by Lucifer's son Jack.

Bartholomew
An angel portrayed by Adam J. Harrington who after the fall of the angels began gathering other angels into a faction to retake and rule Heaven. Bartholomew is described as being a protege of Naomi and in "I'm No Angel", uses Internet preacher Reverend Buddy Boyle to find vessels for other angels. Wanting revenge for the expulsion of the angels, Bartholomew sends his followers after Castiel and when he wards himself against angelic detection, rogue Reapers. In "Holy Terror", Bartholomew has shifted to using Buddy Boyle to target select groups rather than the whole world so he can control who will become a vessel, wanting only his followers to gain vessels. After some of Bartholomew's angels are slaughtered by angels under the command of anarchist Malachi, Bartholomew refuses a meeting with him and starts an angelic civil war between his and Malachi's factions. In Captives, Bartholomew has begun destroying all other factions, including peaceful ones as he sees them threats to his power and his men capture Castiel. Bartholomew is pleased by this, having apparently put aside his previous resentment as he is an old friend and ally of Castiel. Bartholomew invites Castiel to join him, having turned all of his human followers into vessels and using their resources to track Metatron when he appears on Earth. Bartholomew believes with Castiel on his side he can unite all of the angels under his command and retake Heaven, but Castiel refuses to help when he tortures an innocent angel. When Castiel refuses to kill the angel, Bartholomew attacks him, but Castiel overpowers him. Though Castiel has Bartholomew at his mercy, he refuses to kill him as he wants no more angel deaths and lets him go. Bartholomew refuses to stop however and draws a second angel sword and attacks Castiel while his back is turned. With no other choice, Castiel kills Bartholomew in self-defense with his own sword. Afterwards, several of his followers decide to follow Castiel, having seen a different way in Castiel's refusal to kill him and desire for no more bloodshed.

Billie
Introduced in Season 11, Billie, portrayed by Lisa Berry, is a reaper first appearing in "Form and Void." She meets Sam inside a hospital whose inhabitants are dying due to the Darkness' infection, with her acting as their reaper. Despite Dean having killed Death in the previous season, souls are still required to be collected. Billie tells Sam that she is tired of seeing him and Dean dying and coming back over and over again, promising them that the next time they die, she will put them into the Empty, where no soul can ever escape. Billie senses that Sam is "unclean in the Biblical sense" and believes that she will be reaping him soon. Though Sam comes close to succumbing to his Rabid infection, he remembers Billie's comment about being "unclean in the Biblical sense" and discovers a cure through holy fire after looking up Biblical purifications.

In "The Devil in the Details," Billie returns guarding a door into Hell for Crowley, stating that its useful for her to have the King of Hell owe her one in such troubled times. When Dean arrives, Billie lets him in before revealing her identity to him. Billie makes it clear that while she does not actually want to kill the Winchesters, she just intends to make sure they remain dead when they do die. Billie gives a Dean a witchcatcher she has located for Crowley and later lets Castiel through the door when he is unexpectedly teleported into the room.

In "Red Meat," a desperate Dean decides to contact Billie to make a deal after Sam's apparent death. Dean commits suicide through a drug overdose of prescription pills. As a doctor desperately tries to revive Dean, Billie arrives and freezes time to "savor the moment." Though Dean tries to bargain with Billie, she refuses to deal, intent on taking him to the Empty. Though Dean insists that Sam is the only one who can beat the Darkness, Billie expresses disbelief at the idea and tells Dean that even if Sam could defeat the Darkness, she would not bring him back and that "the answer will always be no." Billie then tells the shocked Dean that Sam's not actually dead as she would have been told if Sam had died. Billie unfreezes time and prepares to take Dean to the Empty, but the doctor is able to revive Dean with a shot of adrenaline to the heart. Disappointed, Billie departs alone.

In "Alpha and Omega," Billie witnesses the Winchesters collecting ghosts at Waverly Hills Sanatorium and follows them back to the Men of Letters bunker where she senses that God is dying. After the Winchesters, Castiel, Crowley and God explain their plan to her, Billie agrees to help, stating "little tip—you want souls, call a reaper." Billie is able to draw a couple of hundred thousand souls from the Veil into the crystal for the Winchesters' Soul Bomb, giving them the means to potentially kill the Darkness. Billie departs after saying goodbye to Crowley and tells Dean that while they will see her again, she hopes it is not today.

In Season 12's "Celebrating the Life of Asa Fox," Billie returns to reap the souls of those killed by the demon Jael, warning Dean, who is trapped outside of the house, of the threat. Dean begs Billie to help him get back in, promising that he owes her one in exchange. Billie agrees and throws Dean straight through the door to the house. After Jael is exorcised, Billie reappears to claim the one that Dean owes her: the recently resurrected Mary Winchester. Billie recognizes that Mary is struggling to deal with her return and offers her peace. Mary confirms that Billie cannot kill Mary herself due to the rules and ultimately chooses to stay rather than leave her sons again. Billie leaves Mary be and tells all of the Winchesters that if they ever want peace, all they have to do is call for her.

In "First Blood," Billie reappears at midnight after the Winchesters escape Site 94. Sam and Dean reveal that they were going insane while in captivity so they summoned Billie and made a deal with her: in exchange for Billie temporarily killing them and then later reviving them so that they could escape, one Winchester would die permanently at midnight. Billie made the Winchesters seal the deal in blood and warns that breaking such a deal could have cosmic consequences. As Mary is a Winchester, she decides to sacrifice herself rather than force one of her sons to die and Billie keeps Sam and Dean from interfering. Before Mary can commit suicide, Billie is killed from behind by Castiel with an angel blade to the Winchesters' shock. Castiel expresses a belief that the world cannot afford to lose even one of the family and he was acting in their best interests by killing Billie to break the deal. As a result, Dean is pissed with Castiel through "Lily Sunder Has Some Regrets," eventually admitting that he is worried about Billie's warning of cosmic consequences for breaking the deal.

In Season 13's "Advanced Thanatology," Billie unexpectedly returns after Dean briefly commits suicide to learn the location of the remains of a group of ghosts. When Sam cannot revive Dean, Billie appears and stops time. Billie reveals to Dean that one of the rules of the Universe is that when one incarnation of Death is killed, the next Reaper to die will take his place. As a result, Billie has been resurrected as the new Death with a new outfit and a ring and scythe like the old Death. Billie transports Dean to her office in the Veil and asks him about the rift that had opened briefly to another universe. Dean agrees to tell Billie what she wants to know if she will free the trapped ghosts, a deal Billie accepts and sends the Reaper Jessica to complete. Dean explains the circumstances behind the rift and Billie shows him her library displaying all the possible methods of death for a person. With a new outlook on life and death, Billie soon recognizes how much Dean has changed from his selfless deal and that he actually wants to die. Rather than taking him to the Empty, an amused Billie tells Dean to keep living and personally resurrects Dean. After his return to life, Dean tells Sam about his encounter with Billie as Death.

In "Funeralia," the witch Rowena begins killing people before their time and the Reapers sent to collect their souls in order to attract Billie's attention and force her to resurrect Crowley. In response, Billie has the Reaper Jessica, who she has had following the Winchesters around, alert them to the threat. However, Jessica is unable to intervene directly due to Billie's rules and cannot offer more than information. Jessica also passes along a message from Billie that all versions of Rowena's final death have her killed by Sam. After Rowena begins torturing Sam, Billie appears in person and refuses to bow to Rowena's blackmail. Billie easily withstands Rowena's magical barrage and offers sympathy to Rowena who she recognizes has changed, but continues to refuse to bring back Crowley. Before departing, Billie promises Dean to "see you soon" and Rowena's magical attack on Billie is revealed to have exhausted her enhanced powers, possibly to the point that they will never recover.

In Season 14's "Nihilism," Sam attempts to get the Reaper Violet to transport himself, Castiel, Jack and Michael to safety with Violet refusing because of Billie's rules before they are unexpectedly teleported to the Bunker. After Michael is locked away in Dean's mind, he is visited by Billie who he realizes was the one to save them despite it breaking the rules. Billie admits that she "took a gamble" by helping them and reminds Dean of the time he visited her reading room which showed the many ways he could die. Billie reveals that every single version of his fate but one now has Michael breaking free and using Dean's body to destroy the world and chides Dean for his universe hopping. Billie hands Dean the book containing the one fate that has Michael losing, leaving Dean in shock over what it reveals. Billie tells Dean that it Is up to him to decide what to do with the information and disappears, leaving Dean with the book. In "Damaged Goods," Dean tells Sam that Billie revealed to him that the only way to stop Michael is for Dean to build a Ma'lak Box and trap himself and Michael for eternity. To this end, Billie has provided Dean with the instructions to build the box.

In "Moriah," after God kills Jack and begins the end of the world, Billie appears in the Empty with Jack and the Shadow. As Jack asks what's happening, Billie tells Jack that they need to talk about that.

In Season 15's "The Trap," Billie visits the still-awake Jack in the Empty after the Winchesters choose not to seal God away after learning of the consequences to the world. Billie tells the young Nephilim that "it's time."

In "The Gamblers," Billie is revealed to have resurrected Jack and is guiding him in targeting Grigori, fallen angels that feed on the souls of innocent people. Jack later explains that Billie had kept him hidden in the Empty until God left the Earth at which point it was safe for Jack to be resurrected. Billie has provided Jack with a plan that will allow Jack to become strong enough to kill God himself.

In "Galaxy Brain," Billie is revealed to have been unable to restore Jack's soul when she resurrected him, leaving Jack soulless again. She ignores Jack's prayers, instead assigning a Reaper named Merle to watch over Jack and control him. After Jack opens a rift to the Bad Place against her explicit instructions, Billie kills Merle and explains that God has been destroying all of the alternate universes and states that even God has a book detailing his ultimate fate in her library. Billie states that Jack, Sam and Dean are in the book which God cannot access without her permission, but refuses to explain further beyond Sam and Dean's destiny being to be the messengers of God's destruction.

In "Destiny's Child," Billie reveals that God is almost done destroying other universes and will soon turn his attention back to their world. Billie assigns Jack another quest, this time one of a more spiritual nature than the first quest which was aimed at strengthening Jack's body. Billie instructs the Winchesters, Jack and Castiel to find the Occultum, though she refuses to explain what it will do and does not know where to find it. When Castiel later enters the Empty to talk to Ruby, the Occultum's last owner, its revealed that Billie and the Shadow are working together and as a result, it allowed Billie to resurrect Jack. Billie has promised the entity that once everything is over, she will send it back to sleep, something that it desperately wants, surprising Castiel that Billie can do that. However, while torturing Castiel, the Shadow comments that Billie never mentioned needing Castiel for her plan. Jack ultimately fulfills his quest, resulting in the Occultum restoring Jack's lost soul.

In "Gimme Shelter," Jack reveals that Billie's plan to kill both Chuck and Amara, which involves turning Jack into a bomb that will cause God and the Darkness to cease to exist, will kill him as well.

In "Drag Me Away (From You)," Billie visits Dean and reveals that Chuck is done destroying alternate universes and will soon be back. She has given Jack his final quest to get ready and according to the book, her role is now over until the end. Billie insists that Dean tell Sam the truth and he assures her that he is ready to enact the plan even if he does not like it.

In "Unity," Dean and Jack follow Billie's instructions and track down Adam who reveals that Billie has kept him alive for 300,000 years as he has been coming up with a plan to kill God; Billie has simply been helping Adam enact his plan. At the same time, Sam locates the Key to Death and enters Billie's library in search of her, only to find the Shadow who is also searching for Billie. To Sam's shock, the Shadow reveals that Billie's true plan is to take power as the new God once God and Amara are dead at which point, she will ensure that anyone who has been resurrected will die and that everyone from alternate universes will be returned to their own world which is essentially a death sentence since all of the other worlds are gone. Chuck also admits to Amara that this is all part of his plan to get the Winchesters to kill each other, having goaded Billie along a bit. However, Sam talks Dean out of going through with the plan and an enraged God departs as Jack begins to detonate.

In "Despair," as the Winchesters and Castiel attempt to figure out how to help Jack, Billie appears in the bunker, enraged by their failure to kill Chuck and Amara. Though she cannot stop the detonation, Billie is able to teleport Jack to the Empty where he detonates instead, explaining that with God and Amara gone, only the Shadow can handle that kind of impact. Billie then admits that its possible that Jack survived, pointing out that she only said it would be fatal, not that it would kill him and Castiel realizes that Chuck and Amara's death would have triggered a chain reaction. The group confront Billie over her lies and using them which she admits to and demands Chuck's death book back in exchange for bringing Jack back from the Empty. Sam reluctantly hands the book over, but Billie reads the new ending first which she finds to be interested. Billie brings Jack back, but tries to take him with her as he could still be useful. Grabbing Death's Scythe, Dean slashes Billie in the shoulder, forcing her to flee without Jack, the book or the scythe. After their friends start dying, Dean decides to hunt Billie down, believing her to be responsible. After a brief skirmish, Billie reveals that Chuck was responsible, not her. Mortally wounded by Dean's earlier attack, Billie chases Castiel and Dean in order to kill Dean for good before she dies. Realizing that only the Shadow, who has a grudge against Billie, can stop her, Castiel experiences a moment of true happiness by expressing his love for Dean, thus fulfilling his deal with the Shadow. The Shadow opens a portal to the Empty and sends two tendrils of darkness, one of which absorbs Billie, before both Billie and Castiel are dragged into the Empty.

Castiel

Dumah
Dumah is an angel portrayed by Erica Cerra who is one of the very few angels left alive by Season 13 and appears to hold a position of power amongst the remaining few.

Dumah first appears in "War of the Worlds" as Castiel's contact in Heaven who he meets with about the disappearance of Jack, Lucifer's Nephilim son. Dumah assures Castiel that Jack is not in the angels custody and reveals that they want Jack because they see him as their only chance to make new angels. Dumah tells Castiel that the angels are in danger of going extinct and are willing to go to any measures to survive, including enslaving Jack to make new angels. Dumah brings in two other angels to ambush Castiel who fights back. The brief skirmish is interrupted by the surprise appearance of Lucifer who scares off Dumah and the other two angels.

In "Devil's Bargain," Lucifer and Anael meet with Dumah and several other angels outside of the Heavenly Portal. Lucifer promises that if the angels bow to him as their leader, he can restore their wings and make new angels for them, claiming to know how as he witnessed God making the angels in the first place. Dumah and all of the angels later bow to Lucifer in Heaven's Throne Room. Dumah subsequently appears in "Bring 'em Back Alive" and is ordered by Lucifer to dispatch angels to find his son. After a brief hesitation, she agrees.

In "Funeralia," Castiel returns to a Heaven experiencing power fluctuations. He is finally met by Dumah and a few other angels and requests their help, telling them about the fact that Gabriel is still alive, the upcoming invasion by an alternate Michael, the trapped Jack and the danger of Lucifer. As the power fluctuates around them, Dumah tells Castiel that they might be able to help each other, orders him to wait in the throne room and disappears for a while. When she returns, Dumah tells Castiel that if he can find Gabriel and bring him back to Heaven, the angels can help him with everything else such as finding Michael and defending Earth. When Castiel tells her that he cannot find them which is why he needs her help, Dumah admits that that is a problem. Castiel asks why Dumah cannot just send a few angels to search for Gabriel before Naomi appears and tells him that Dumah will not help him because she and the angels cannot. Naomi subsequently explains that there are now less than a dozen angels left alive which includes Castiel, Naomi and Dumah. The low number of angels is causing the power fluctuations in Heaven and if things do not change soon, the angels will burn out and Heaven will crumble. As a result, Naomi and Heaven's remaining angels cannot leave Heaven without risking it crumbling.

In "Byzantium," Castiel finds that Heaven has been invaded by the Cosmic Entity in search of Jack's soul. Castiel encounters an unconscious Dumah who wakes up and joins Castiel on his mission to find and resurrect Jack. After Castiel finds Jack, Dumah is revealed to be possessed by the Entity who uses her form to attack Castiel and make a deal with him. When the Entity departs Heaven, it leaves Dumah's body, leaving her with apparently no memory of her possession.

In "Absence," Dumah appears when Castiel calls for Naomi after the death of Mary Winchester. Dumah will only tell him that Naomi is "indisposed," but confirms that Mary Winchester is dead and at peace in Heaven. To prove it, Dumah allows Castiel into Heaven where he witnesses Mary at peace in a shared Heaven with John Winchester.

In "Jack in the Box," Castiel returns to Heaven to seek Naomi's help in finding Jack. Dumah reveals that she has overthrown Naomi, pointing out that the Entity invaded Heaven under Naomi's watch and nearly killed all of the angels. Though Dumah promises to help, she locates Jack and begins manipulating him for her own ends, creating a reign of terror wherein humans are beaten into submission, Heaven is stripped of all mercy and Jack acts to solidify Dumah's own power. Dumah defends her actions as being necessary to save Heaven, the angels and the world and states her intentions to guide Jack. When Castiel moves to take Jack and leave, Dumah stops him and threatens to use her new power over Heaven to end John and Mary's peaceful shared Heaven together with just a snap of her fingers. Enraged, Castiel instantly draws his angel blade and kills Dumah before she can react, leaving her body on the floor of Heaven as Castiel heads off after Jack. In "Moriah," Jack recognizes that Dumah had been using him when talking with Castiel.

Gabriel

Gabriel (also referred to as the Trickster or Loki) is an archangel portrayed by Richard Speight, Jr. Having grown tired of watching his brothers fight each other in Heaven, he fled to Earth thousands of years prior to the series, assuming the role of a Pagan trickster. For his first appearance in an episode from Season 2 "Tall Tales", the writers decided not to put their own spin on trickster lore— as is usually done with other villains— keeping the "deadly sense of humor" and decision to go after the "high and mighty to bring them down a notch", with Gabriel causing several violent urban legends to come to life on a college campus and punish those residing there. Sam and Dean Winchester investigate and eventually figure out his identity, though the Trickster is waiting for them and offers a peaceful resolution so long as they let him leave to terrorize another town. Sam and Dean refuse, and attack him with the help of fellow hunter Bobby Singer, and the Trickster fakes his own death.

The Trickster reappears in the Season 3 episode "Mystery Spot", trapping Sam in a time loop where Dean ends up dying in many different ways. After over a hundred loops, Sam threatens the Trickster with a blood-covered stake, after which he agrees to break the loop. But when Sam considers killing him regardless, the Trickster sends the two to the next day where Dean once again dies, but is unable to be resurrected due to there being no more time loop. Months later, he calls Sam to him, where he tries to drive in a point: the two brothers continually sacrificing themselves for one another would bring no good, and when people die, their survivors just have to learn to accept it and live with it.  However the Trickster gives Sam what he wants, lamenting the whole situation had become boring months ago for him anyway.

In the Season 5 episode "Changing Channels", he lures the Winchesters to him with a case that makes it obvious he is involved. He traps Sam and Dean in an endless thread of television shows where they must play out their roles to survive, while ignoring their attempts at having him in them in the apocalypse. Gabriel also explains this was his way of getting them to consequently be willing to accept their roles as vessels for Lucifer and Michael respectively. In one of the scenarios, he banishes Castiel and is livid at a response about the Archangels. He is later stabbed with a stake, a move that would kill regular trickster spirits, however, he continues to put them in the shows. Dean and Sam trap him in a burning circle of holy oil, suspecting he is an angel because he survived the staking, how he and Castiel interacted, and his anger at the insults of the Archangels. He then reveals that he is the archangel Gabriel, which does not surprise them. He explains he left Heaven because of the conflict of his family, he even expresses his desire for the Winchesters to say yes to becoming Michael's and Lucifer's vessels since their lives mirror that of the angels. Dean forces him to bring Castiel back and frees Gabriel from his trap and accuses him of giving up because he is simply too afraid to stand up to his own family.

Gabriel returns in "Hammer of the Gods", attending the summit of pagan gods under the guise of Loki; however, he intends to rescue the brothers as their plan to lure Lucifer would easily fail, and Lucifer would slaughter them all. As he intends to prevent Kali, an old flame, from suffering a bloody fate, he tries to get them out; but he tells them he cannot rescue the pagan's hostages as it would be too difficult. However, later he is forced to comply; the rescue attempt results in the brothers' capture once again. Kali (who is keeping the brothers from leaving as their spilled blood binds them to her) reveals she, along with the other gods, knew of his identity for a while. Kali takes his sword and stabs him with it apparently killing him, but Gabriel appears to Dean and reveals the sword was a fake and suggests Dean should seduce Kali so they can escape. Lucifer shows up at the hotel, slaughtering most of the gods. Gabriel is then forced to step in, allowing Kali and the brothers to leave. Gabriel confronts his brother about loyalties and their past, but ultimately fails and is killed by his own blade. He later reveals, through a modified porn movie, Lucifer can be recaptured in his previous prison, with the four rings of the Horsemen.

Gabriel returns in the Season 9 episode "Meta Fiction" where he reveals to Castiel that he has been in Heaven since he 'died'. However, when Heaven kicked all the angels out, Gabriel was forced to go on the run from Metatron. He tells Castiel that Metatron was using the Horn of Gabriel to trap and kill the angels and that he needs Castiel to help him fight. When the two are running, they stop at a gas station where they realize that some of Metatron's loyal subjects were following them. Gabriel offers to fight them off because he still has some of his Archangel powers left but then Castiel realizes that the whole situation was an illusion. Castiel then asks if Gabriel is really still alive, but all Gabriel does for an answer is raise his eyebrows before disappearing. Metatron says later that Gabriel played out his part well.

In "We Happy Few", God confirms that Gabriel is dead when they discuss how the four archangels were required to help God barely defeat the Darkness the first time. God tells the Winchesters that while they have Lucifer fighting with them, Michael is in no shape to fight and Raphael and Gabriel are dead. When Dean reminds God that he has resurrected Castiel before, God tells him that he cannot resurrect the archangels so easily as they are beings of primordial creation. As a result, it will take far too much time to resurrect Gabriel and Raphael to help fight the Darkness.

In the season 13 "Devil's Bargain", the Prince of Hell Asmodeus reveals to Arthur Ketch that he has gotten his hands on an Archangel Blade, the only known weapon that can kill an archangel. When Arthur reminds Asmodeus that the lore states that only an archangel can wield the blade, Asmodeus reveals that he has Gabriel, somehow still alive, as his prisoner. Gabriel is now in a beaten and bloody state with his mouth sewn shut.

In "The Thing", Arthur discovers that Asmodeus is injecting himself with Gabriel's grace to power up. Following a brutal beating by Asmodeus, Arthur rescues Gabriel and steals the archangel blade and Asmodeus' store of Gabriel's grace. Arthur brings the traumatized Gabriel to the Winchesters who are shocked to see the archangel whom they believed to be dead and learn of his captivity. Using Gabriel's extracted grace, the Winchesters are able to complete a ritual to open a door into an alternate reality that Dean passes through, leaving Sam and Gabriel behind.

In "Bring 'em Back Alive", Sam and Castiel attempt to treat the traumatized Gabriel who cringes away from all attempts to help him and appears unable to speak, even with the stitches holding his mouth shut cut. Gabriel eventually writes his story on the wall in Enochian, revealing that he actually faked his death during the Apocalypse by tricking Lucifer into stabbing another duplicate of himself. Free of responsibility, Gabriel returned to a hedonistic lifestyle in Monte Carlo until he was captured and sold to Asmodeus. After a plea by Sam, Gabriel starts responding, but retreats into himself again after learning that Asmodeus knows where he is. When Asmodeus invades the bunker, Gabriel is recaptured, but snaps out of his traumatized state when Asmodeus starts torturing Sam and Castiel. Healing himself, Gabriel quickly kills Asmodeus, he is informed of the events that followed in his absence but refuses to help further and departs the bunker. With the departure of Gabriel and the use of the last of his stored grace in an effort to heal him, the Winchesters are left without a way to reopen the door to Apocalypse World. They are also left without a powerful ally who could have helped them fight Michael.

During "Funeralia", Castiel visited Heaven and the other angels aware of Gabriel still being alive, to their surprise. Naomi tasked Castiel with retrieving Gabriel so that Heaven could properly fluctuate because of the low number of angels.
 
In "Unfinished Business", Gabriel seeks revenge on the pagan gods Loki, Fenrir, Narfi and Sleipnir. It Is revealed that millennia before, Gabriel rescued Loki and made a deal with him where Gabriel took on Loki's form and persona as The Trickster to go into "witness protection." Gabriel had sought out Loki's help after faking his death only to have Loki betray him and sell Gabriel to Asmodeus. Low on grace and wounded, Gabriel arms himself with specially-crafted wooden swords and seeks the help of the Winchesters after he is wounded and sense they were following him. In exchange for Gabriel helping them, the Winchesters agree to help Gabriel get revenge. With the help of the Winchesters, Gabriel kills Fenrir, Narfi and Slepnir before facing off with Loki (also played by Richard Speight, Jr.) who blames Gabriel for his father Odin's murder by Lucifer and wants revenge. Gabriel kills Loki and keeps his promise to return to the bunker with the Winchesters and joins their quest to stop Michael.

In "Beat the Devil", Gabriel gives up some of his archangel grace to complete the spell to open up the rift to Apocalypse World, but the spell fails. Gabriel and Rowena banter about where the fault over the spell's failure lies and Rowena flirts with Gabriel,leading them to have sex,much to the horror of the Winchesters. He then assists the Winchesters in their plan to capture Lucifer and use his grace to complete the spell. The plan succeeds and Gabriel travels with the Winchesters and Castiel to Apocalypse World. While traveling to find Mary and Jack, Castiel informs Gabriel of the precarious situation in Heaven but Gabriel is reluctant to intervene. Sam is killed during a battle with a nest of vampires. The group then finds the human camp where Mary and Jack are, and Gabriel and Castiel work together to break the warding against angels so they can enter. After informing Mary and Jack of Sam's demise, Jack asks why Gabriel or Castiel did not revive him, but Gabriel tells him that they are not strong enough. Lucifer then enters the camp with a resurrected Sam.

In "Exodus", Gabriel interacts with his nephew and brother before he angrily disagrees with Lucifer's characterization of his and his family's history, telling Lucifer and Jack that Lucifer only plays the victim to excuse his evil deeds. That night, as Gabriel guards Lucifer, they argue and Gabriel compares Lucifer to a cancer cell, saying that God was right to cast him into the cage, which causes Lucifer become emotional and shed tears. Later, he helps the Winchesters and their allies evacuate Apocalypse World. The alternate version of Michael then appears, which shocks Gabriel. He watches as Lucifer is tossed aside and Michael setting his sights on him, as Gabriel tells the Winchesters he is not running and decides to confront Michael. They then battle with him doing very well and landing hits on Michael, who overpowers and kills Gabriel with an archangel blade, to the Winchester's horror. The Winchesters use this as a distraction and retreat to their world. They inform Castiel of Gabriel's demise, which saddens him but he takes comfort in being told that he died a noble death in helping them all escape.

Gadreel
An angel portrayed by Tahmoh Penikett and Jared Padalecki, Gadreel was assigned to guard the Garden of Eden but was disgraced when Lucifer got in, which God and angels regarded as his fault. Gadreel was locked up in Heaven's deepest dungeon and heavily tortured for his failure, but was released when Metatron's spell made all angels fall to Earth. Wanting to make up for his past, Gadreel answers Dean's prayers for help, taking on the identity of an angel named Ezekiel, who died in the Fall. When Gadreel's powers cannot heal Sam. he proposes a solution: if he possesses Sam, he could heal him from the inside while recuperating from his own injuries from falling. Dean ultimately agrees and Gadreel invades Sam's mind, assuming Dean's form to manipulate Sam into consenting to angelic possession. Gadreel tells Dean that he will let Sam keep control of his body while he himself works in the background, but that it is best that Sam not know he is there. If Sam does not allow Gadreel to remain in his body, Sam could eject him and would die as a result. In the following episodes, Gadreel occasionally takes control of Sam's body in order to kill enemies when they get the better of Sam, to resurrect slain allies of Sam and Dean, and to heal the injuries Sam gets on hunts. He regularly erases Sam's memory of these moments in attempt to keep Sam from getting suspicious. Gadreel is wary of Castiel's presence as he fears being found by the angels looking for Castiel to the point that he would have vacated Sam's body—and in doing so, consigned Sam to die—to flee if Dean had not agreed to make Castiel leave the bunker in "I'm No Angel".

When Castiel turns up on a case in mid-season finale "Holy Terror," Gadreel once more forces Dean to send him away. In the same episode, he crosses paths with Metatron, who reveals his true identity and backstory and offers him a chance to "redeem" himself by becoming his second-in-command and helping him create a new, better Heaven. After discerning that Dean has learned new information from Castiel that he is not Ezekiel and has turned against him, now attempting to tell Sam the truth and get him to expel him, Gadreel murders Kevin and steals the tablets on Metatron's orders in a show of allegiance to the latter. The following episode, "Road Trip", Metatron sends Gadreel to kill his former guard and torturer to please his new follower; when he finds out that Gadreel did not kill Dean as well as Kevin, however, Gadreel is punished by being forced to kill again, this time his old friend Abner. He is then captured by Dean, Castiel, and Crowley, who learn his true identity when Crowley drives spikes through Gadreel's brain to revert him to his trance-like "factory settings" and an enraged Castiel reveals the cause of Gadreel's infamy to Dean. Gadreel then reverts to normal and tells them that he will not leave Sam's body, nor can they reach Sam, whom he has placed in a fantasy world unaware of what is really happening. With Crowley revealing the truth to Sam by possessing him to communicate with him, Gadreel and Sam fight briefly before Sam finally expels him. Gadreel continues working for Metatron, recruiting angels for their side in "Meta Fiction" and killing the ones who refuse. Gadreel is captured and interrogated by Sam and Dean, but refuses to give up any information and instead tries to push Dean into killing him, which fails as Dean knows they need Gadreel. Gadreel is saved when Metatron has them trade him Gadreel for Castiel, whom he has captured.

In "King of the Damned", Gadreel meets with Castiel, who tries to persuade Gadreel that he is being used by Metatron and should be working against him, as Castiel's spy. Gadreel declines as he believes that betraying a cause he has dedicated himself to would infringe on his honor; Castiel is sympathetic and leaves his offer open. The next episode, Gadreel discovers that Metatron is having his own angels—ones Gadreel himself had recruited—kill themselves and frame Castiel,causing him to lose his support, which proves to be the incentive he needed to turn on the cause. Gadreel offers his assistance to Castiel and the Winchesters; although Dean attacks him, Gadreel is saved by Sam and Castiel, who agree to accept his help. In the finale, "Do You Believe in Miracles?", Gadreel and Castiel plot to sneak into Heaven using a Portal as the Gates are sealed and break Metatron's connection to the angel tablet, so that Metatron will revert to the powers and weaknesses of a normal angel again and Dean can kill him with the First Blade. However, their scheme is already known to Metatron's angels, who trick them into Heaven's dungeon and imprison them. They cannot convince the angels to help them against Metatron, due to Gadreel's negative reputation. Hoping that he will be remembered as an angel who helped save Heaven instead of the angel who let Lucifer into the Garden, Gadreel sacrifices himself by using the suicide bombers' sigil to destroy himself and the dungeon, thus freeing Castiel and in the process convincing one of Metatron's angels (Hannah) of his good intentions.

Hannah
Hannah, portrayed by Erica Carroll and Lee Majdoub in her female and male vessels, respectively, is one of the countless number of angels who fell from Heaven due to Metatron's incantation of the angel banishing spell at the end of "Sacrifice". She possesses a married woman named Caroline Johnson as her vessel on Earth. In the episode "Meta Fiction", Hannah and several other angels are lured by the Horn of Gabriel Sigil enchanted by Gadreel. She attempts to sneak and kill Castiel, who is also lured by the sigil but fails and begs for her life. Joining Castiel, the two arrive at the sigil and meet Gadreel, who offers the two and other angels a chance to join Metatron. When Hannah and her friends refuse, Gadreel proceeds to kill nearly all angels in the area, but spares Hannah, who is healed by Castiel; it is later revealed that Metatron deliberately tells Gadreel to spare Hannah so she could inform Castiel about what happened. Hannah then becomes Castiel's second-in-command from then on, helping him building an angel army in the war against Metatron. In "Stairway To Heaven", Hannah convinces Dean to approach civilly with Tessa, who has been used by Metatron as a suicide bomber; she becomes furious when Dean apparently killed Tessa with the First Blade (though the latter actually committed suicide) and is further infuriated when she learns from Metatron's broadcast that Castiel had lied about his dwindling grace. Hannah and Castiel's other angel allies join Metatron's army upon Castiel's refusal to kill Dean in retribution for Tessa's death. During Castiel and Gadreel's arrival at Heaven to destroy Metatron's angel tablet in "Do You Believe In Miracles?", Hannah catches and locks them up in the Heaven's prison. She refuses to believe that killing Metatron would restore the order, accusing Castiel and Gadreel of their lie and selfishness, respectively. However, she becomes convinced when Gadreel kills himself to prove his fidelity to humans and joins Castiel in his insurgency against Metatron. Eventually, the two manage to topple Metatron, who is imprisoned, though Hannah warns Castiel at the end that his dwindling grace would result in his death.

After Metatron's downfall, Hannah takes charge to return all the fallen angels back to Heaven. She contacts Castiel to help her in returning two rogue angels, Daniel and Adina, who have become content with their life on Earth. Though Hannah fails to return the two with their death, Castiel decides to accompany her for the time being in her task. Throughout their journey, the two develop a romantic relationship, with Hannah becoming protective enough of Castiel that she suggests killing a rogue angel and feed its grace to Castiel, though he declines. However, when she encounters her vessel, Caroline's husband searching for his wife, Hannah realizes that Caroline deserves more chance to enjoy her mortal life. Deciding that she has enjoyed her time on Earth, Hannah releases Caroline of her grace, but not before kissing Castiel; inspired by her decision, Castiel contacts his vessel, Jimmy Novak's family.

Since leaving her main vessel, Caroline, Hannah has been taking a man as her new vessel. She blocks Sam and Castiel from entering Heaven to free Metatron, and when the two get around with the plan with Bobby's help, she and several other angels corner Bobby afterwards to punish him for his actions. According to Metatron in Book of the Damned, Hannah has been leading Heaven since his downfall and that it is "the best" it has ever been since the archangels' disappearances/deaths. In Form and Void, Hannah saves Castiel from being tortured by two angels, but he soon realizes that it is a ruse so she can get information about the Winchesters from him. The two other angels attempt to "hack" Castiel's brain, something that Hannah is uncomfortable with. While the angels argue, Castiel falls under the influence of Rowena MacLeod's Attack Dog Spell again and breaks free. In the scuffle that follows, Hannah is murdered by the angel Efram for her interference, but Castiel kills both Efram and his partner Jonah in turn. Subsequently, in The Bad Seed, an angel tells a demon that things in Heaven have gotten bad since Hannah's death.

Hester
Hester is an angel portrayed by Emily Holmes who once served under the command of Castiel. After Castiel's departure from Heaven, Hester presumably took control over his garrison.

In Season 7's "Reading is Fundamental," Hester appears in a psychiatric hospital with the angel Inias after Kevin Tran is chosen as a Prophet following the uncovering of the Leviathan Tablet. Hester is disgusted to see Sam with the demon Meg and orders Meg and Sam killed and Kevin taken to the desert. The confrontation is interrupted by the appearance of Castiel who the angels are shocked to see as he is believed to be dead. Hester is enraged by Castiel's appearance after everything he has done and further by his obvious insanity. Before the situation can devolve any further, Dean banishes all three angels using an angel banishing sigil. Later, after Meg kills two demons, Hester returns with Inias and two other angels. Hester refuses to let Kevin translate the tablet for the Winchesters and, blaming Dean for Castiel's state, goes to attack him. When Castiel intervenes, Hester has an emotional breakdown and beats Castiel who refuses to fight back with Hester refusing to relent even when Inias pleads with her to. When Hester goes to kill Castiel, Meg stabs Hester through the back with an angel blade, killing her. Meg justifies that "someone had to" to her shocked audience. Following Hester's death, the more agreeable Inias takes control of the situation and allows Kevin to finish the translation before sending two angels to protect him at his home rather than the desert.

Ishim
Ishim, portrayed by Ian Tracey, is a powerful angel and garrison commander Castiel once served under appearing in Season 12.

After the murder of the angel Benjamin in "Lily Sunder Has Some Regrets," Ishim calls for a meeting with Mirabel and Castiel, all that is left of his old garrison and is displeased when the Winchesters accompany Castiel. Ishim reveals that in addition to Benjamin's murder, two more angels of their old garrison have been killed over the past few years. After Mirabel leaves and does not come back, Ishim heads outside and is shocked to find Mirabel dead and Lily Sunder waiting for him. Lily proves immune to Ishim's smiting power and wounds Ishim with an angel blade before Castiel and the Winchesters intervene, driving her off. Retreating to an old church, Castiel and Ishim recite the story of a time in 1901 when their garrison was sent to execute the angel Akobel for fathering a Nephilim. After Akobel's death, Ishim killed the young girl alone but left her mother, Lily Sunder, alive out of pity. Ishim claims that Lily must have made a deal for demonic power and is left with Castiel as the Winchesters go after Lily. Castiel heals Ishim's injuries, leaving Ishim feeling better than he has in a millennium but leaving Castiel weakened.

When the Winchesters confront Lily, she reveals the truth: a professor of apocalyptic literature, Lily had been obsessed with angels and eventually discovered a spell to summon one. The spell summoned Ishim who became obsessed with Lily and told her a great many of the angels' secrets. However, Lily recognized that Ishim was in fact a monster and left him and married Akobel for protection. Her daughter was human and the murders of Akobel and May were Ishim getting revenge upon her. Lily's powers in fact come from Enochian magic, something that burns away part of her soul every time she uses it. Dean returns to the church and reveals the truth to Castiel, leading to a fight with Ishim who defeats both of them and forces Dean not to use an angel banishing sigil upon him. Lily arrives with Sam and engages Ishim in combat but proves to be no match for the powerful angel even with Sam and Dean's help. Ishim fights through Lily's telekinesis and attempts to kill her with an angel blade. At the last moment, Castiel stabs Ishim through the back with his own angel blade, killing him and saving Lily as well as avenging Akobel and May. Though Lily achieves her revenge with Ishim's death, she is left unsure of whether or not she can let go of her vengeance upon Castiel.

Ishim is mentioned again in Season 14's "Byzantium." Lily is shown to have given up her revenge with his death and explains that she was so consumed with rage at Ishim, she swore to get revenge upon him even if it meant burning up her entire soul in the process. However, a sliver still survives and her new goal now that she has had her revenge is to get into Heaven to be with her daughter that Ishim murdered.

Jack Kline

Jack Kline, portrayed by Alexander Calvert, is a Nephilim and the son of Lucifer and Kelly Kline. He is the first and only known Nephilim to be sired by an Archangel. Jack was taken in by Sam Winchester and Dean Winchester who would teach him how to master his powers. During this time, Jack played in the resurrection of Castiel whom he had chosen as his father.

Jack left the Winchesters and Castiel to go off to master his powers and, in an effort to prove that he is good, searched for a way to locate Mary Winchester for her sons. Jack traveled to 'Apocalypse World' where he rescued Mary and they fought Michael's angel army to protect a human colony. Wanting to free the Apocalypse World from Michael's reign, Jack helped Mary to consolidate the human survivor groups to form a resistance and stand against the angels, including an alternate version of Bobby Singer.

In the months that followed, Jack's resistance engaged the angels in numerous conflicts; using his abilities, Jack frequently turned the tide of the battle in favor of the resistance, and he gained the respect and admiration of many key leaders. Later, he was reunited with Sam, Dean, and Castiel, during which time he also met his biological father Lucifer and his 'uncle' Gabriel. Lucifer tempted Jack to join his interests by portraying himself as a sympathetic victim; however, Gabriel, Castiel, and the Winchesters reminded Jack of Lucifer's history and encouraged him to trust his instincts. Reluctantly, Jack began to believe Lucifer and hoped they could defeat Michael together. Even so, these hopes were cut short by the Winchesters who stranded Lucifer during the evacuation of the resistance to their world.

Lucifer however returned and offered to take Jack to the stars where they could go on a father-son journey cross the known universe. Jack at first accepted, but after discovering that Lucifer cut a deal with Michael to abandon the earth so that it could be completely destroyed, Jack disowned him as his father. In retaliation, Lucifer attacked Jack and stole his grace to attack Michael, kidnapping both Jack and Sam after defeating him. Lucifer attempted to force Jack and Sam to kill each other, but the pair were rescued by Dean (who was empowered by the Alternate Michael). Though Michael/Dean defeated Lucifer, their victory was cut short when Michael assumed complete control of Dean's body.

Months after Lucifer's death, Jack struggled with trying to adjust to life as a human; still wanting to contribute, he takes lessons on hunting and magic from the human survivors and Castiel, though he secretly hides an illness that stems from his lack of grace and his body attacking itself. He ultimately succumbs to his illness and ascends to Heaven where he meets his mother for the first time, he is also pursued by the empty's ruler The Shadow who attempts to bring him to his domain. Because of Castiel's intervention, he is resurrected with Enochian magic keeping him alive. In a confrontation with Michael, he taps into the power of his soul and finally kills Michael, ending his reign of terror and absorbing the Archangel's grace to regain his own Nephilim powers. However, he starts to show that he is not necessarily back to himself, since he burned off a large portion of his soul in the process. It Is eventually revealed that Jack used up all of his soul to kill Michael and is now completely soulless.

In "Moriah," God provides the Winchesters with a gun that can kill Jack, though it will also kill the shooter—ostensibly due to the danger Jack poses. Enraged at the loss of his mother, Dean confronts Jack in a cemetery where he has been meeting with Castiel. Rather than fight, Jack accepts that in his soulless state he really is a monster and orders Dean to kill him. However, Dean cannot bring himself to kill Jack, enraging God who wanted Jack dead at Dean's hands due to the perfect addition Dean, as Jack's father, killing Jack would make to his story. Even with God offering to resurrect Mary again, Dean refuses to kill Jack, knowing that Mary would not want him to make that deal. With the Winchesters and Castiel turning against him, God smites Jack with a snap of his fingers and begins the end of the world. As all of the souls of Hell rise, Jack awakens in the Empty where he is greeted by the Shadow and Billie. As Jack wonders what's happening, Billie tells him that they need to talk about that. His corpse was subsequently used as a vessel by the demon Belphegor to help the Winchesters after he escaped from Hell. However, Castiel smote Belphegor after learning that the demon intended to use the Winchesters to gain power for himself. This second smiting burnt Jack's corpse into a charred skeleton which was apparently left on the floor of Lilith's Chamber in Hell when Castiel had to climb out before the rupture between Earth and Hell closed.

In Season 15's "The Trap," Jack is revealed to still be awake in the Empty. As he looks around the realm, Billie appears to tell Jack that "it's time."

In "The Gamblers," a resurrected Jack is discovered by Castiel to be hunting Grigori, fallen angels who have been feeding on the souls of innocent people. After killing the Grigori, Jack eats their hearts to grow stronger, but refuses to use his powers as it will draw God's attention to him and reveal his resurrection. Castiel rescues Jack from the last of the Grigori and Jack is reunited with his family. Jack explains that Billie had kept him hidden away in the Empty until God left the Earth at which point it was safe for Billie to resurrect him. Billie has provided Jack with a plan that will allow Jack to become strong enough to kill God himself.

In "Galaxy Brain," the resurrected Jack is revealed to still be soulless, causing worry amongst the Winchesters given what happened last time. After learning that Kaia is alive and trapped in the Bad Place from Dark Kaia, the Winchesters attempt to find a way back without using Jack's powers. As they attempt to find a solution, Jack views Kaia through Dark Kaia's mind and decides to take the risk to help his friend. With the reluctant help of a Reaper named Merle, assigned by Billie to watch over Jack, the Winchesters and Castiel manage to temporarily hide Jack's use of powers from God, allowing him to open a rift to the Bad Place. After Kaia's rescue, Billie kills Merle for failing to keep Jack in line and explains that everyone has a book in Death's library detailing their fate, even God. The book describing God's ultimate destruction mentions Jack, Sam and Dean, though Billie refuses to elaborate further.

In "Destiny's Child," the Winchesters discuss the ramifications of Jack killing God and consider having him kill the Darkness as well to maintain the balance. After a brief encounter with an alternate Sam and Dean, Billie arrives to warn that God is almost done destroying alternate universes and will soon return to their world. Billie reveals that she has another quest for Jack, stating that the first was to strengthen his body but the second is more spiritual in nature. Billie instructs them to find the Occultum though she does not know where it is and refuses to explain what it will do for Jack. While the Winchesters talk to Anael, Jack speaks with Castiel about being soulless and how he cannot feel emotion anymore, something that he is clearly bothered by, though he still understands why he once felt the way he did and the pain Jack caused the Winchesters by killing Mary. Jack questions if Dean will ever forgive him and Castiel assures the young Nephilim that with time Dean likely will. After the Winchesters depart to Hell to search for the Occultum, supposedly hidden there by Ruby, Castiel has Jack drain most of his life force so that Castiel can travel into the Empty and question Ruby herself. Jack reluctantly complies and brings Castiel back on Sam and Dean's orders when they return. Having gotten the Occultum's location, Castiel leads the others to a church guarded by hellhounds where they uncover a small orb. Swallowing the orb, Jack is transported to the Garden of Eden where he is confronted by a mysterious young girl and the Snake. After the Snake asks who Jack is and who he is meant to be, Jack experiences flashes of his life before collapsing in tears. Jack's return to the church kills the hellhounds and Sam and Dean later find him in the bunker's kitchen, crying with remorse and horror over killing Mary. To Sam and Dean's shock, Castiel reveals that the Occultum restored Jack's lost soul.

The Winchesters
In the season finale, Jack appears in the Monster Club's universe with Bobby Singer to admonish Dean for breaking Jack's rule on direct interference. However, Dean points out that the Akrida were a threat to their world as well and Sam. With Bobby backing Dean up, Jack acknowledges that there's always another case for hunters, even after death, and he allows Dean to finish his work, returning Dean's journal and the Colt to him. After Dean says goodbye to his parents, Jack vanishes with Dean, Bobby and the Impala in a flash of light.

Jessica
Jessica is a Reaper portrayed by Kayla Stanton who works under Billie following her resurrection as the new Death and is introduced in Season 13. Unlike most Reapers, Jessica has a friendly and bright attitude to make it easier for the deceased, but maintains a "hands off" policy in dealing with the living due to Billie's rules.

Jessica first appears in "Advanced Thanatology" after Dean briefly commits suicide to find out the location of the bodies of a group of ghosts trapped in a house from the ghosts themselves. Jessica greets Dean who simply brushes her off before carrying on. Realizing who Dean is, Jessica travels into the Veil and alerts Billie to Dean's death. After Dean makes a deal with Billie for her to free the ghosts trapped in the house, Billie sends Jessica to complete the deal. Jessica is able to get the ghosts to move onto the afterlife and watches with a smile as they ascend to Heaven before reporting to Billie telepathically that the job is done. As a result of Billie and Jessica freeing the ghosts, the Winchesters are able to alert the authorities to recover the bodies and return them to their families rather than having to salt and burn them.

Jessica returns in "Funeralia" where she reveals that Billie has been having her follow the Winchesters around. Jessica warns the Winchesters that the witch Rowena is killing people ahead of their time and the Reapers sent to collect their souls, thus messing with fate. Due to Billie's rules, Jessica is unable to intervene directly and has instead been sent to warn the Winchesters so they can deal with the problem. During the case, Jessica constantly hovers around the Winchesters, offering information, but refusing to intervene directly in situations even when they are in danger due to Billie's rules. After the situation is resolved, Jessica disappears again.

In Season 14's "Nihilism," a desperate Sam attempts to call on Jessica for help with escaping from Michael's monsters. However, the Reaper Violet appears instead. Violet explains that the Reapers are now on shifts watching the Winchesters instead of Jessica handling the job alone.

Joshua
Joshua is an angel who is described as Heaven's gardener and is portrayed by Roger Aaron Brown and Paul Barton. Following God's departure from Heaven, Joshua is the only angel that God still speaks to, though Joshua himself clarifies that it is more that God talks to him, not that they hold a conversation, and he suggests that it is because he can relate "gardener to gardener."

Joshua first appears in Season 5's "Dark Side of the Moon" where the Winchesters are instructed to find him by Castiel after they are murdered and end up in Heaven. Castiel sees Joshua as the best chance of finding God or at least of learning what God is saying due to the widespread knowledge of Joshua and God talking. The Winchesters efforts to find Joshua are interrupted by Zachariah who intends to torture them so that Dean will say "yes" to possession by the archangel Michael. However, Joshua appears to intervene, having been sent by God. Joshua is able to force Zachariah to back off and transports the Winchesters to Heaven's Garden. There, Joshua reveals that while God saved them when Lucifer rose and resurrected Castiel, He has no intention of doing so again and wants them to back off. Joshua expresses sympathy for their cause, telling them that he wishes he could do more "but I just trim the hedges." Joshua resurrects Sam and Dean and leaves their memories of their trip to Heaven intact on God's orders.

In Season 12's "Somewhere Between Heaven and Hell," the angel Kelvin reveals to Castiel that Joshua has taken up a leadership role in the hunt for Lucifer's unborn Nephilim son. Kelvin proposes Castiel join the angels search, telling him that if he does, Joshua can get Castiel pardoned for his crimes. After warning the Winchesters about the Prince of Hell Dagon, Castiel travels to Heaven with Kelvin to meet with Joshua.

In "The Future," Castiel leads an attack to kill Dagon and Kelly Kline, the mother of Lucifer's child, with the Colt on Joshua's orders. The mission results in Kelvin's capture and the death of another angel, but Castiel cannot bring himself to outright kill Kelly and instead abducts her. Castiel is instructed by Joshua over "angel radio" to bring Kelly to the portal to Heaven as passage through it will kill both Kelly and her child. When the two arrive at the portal, Joshua himself emerges to greet them. However, he is combusted to dust moments later by Dagon. After killing Joshua, Dagon reveals that she had learned of their backup plan from Kelvin and laid in wait for hours to ambush the angels when they arrived at the portal.

Kelvin
Kelvin is an angel portrayed by Nathan Mitchell who was a major part of the hunt for Lucifer's unborn Nephilim child. Having met Castiel only once before, Kelvin first appears in Season 12's "Somewhere Between Heaven and Hell" when Castiel is investigating the deaths of two angels at the hands of the Prince of Hell Dagon. Unlike many of his siblings, Kelvin holds no grudge against Castiel and proposes that Castiel join the angels hunt. In exchange, Kelvin promises Castiel that the angel Joshua, who is leading the effort, can get Castiel pardoned for his crimes. After warning the Winchesters about Dagon, Castiel joins Kelvin in going to Heaven to meet with Joshua.

In "The Future," Kelvin is part of Castiel's team to kill Dagon and the child's mother Kelly Kline with the Colt. During the fight, another angel named Hozai is killed by Dagon and Kelvin is captured while Castiel abducts Kelly and escapes. After communicating with Lucifer telepathically, Dagon extensively tortures Kelvin for information, figuring that despite the fact that Kelvin is unaware of any backup plans, he would be able to figure out what the angels would do next. After killing Joshua, Dagon reveals that she had succeeded in getting information from Kelvin and then killed him hours before.

Lucifer
Lucifer, portrayed primarily by Mark Pellegrino, Jared Padalecki, Misha Collins, Rick Springfield and David Chisum, is the second oldest archangel, the first fallen angel, introduced as a recurring character in Season 5 of the series. From his prison in hell, he orchestrated events not only seen in Seasons 1 through 4, but decades prior, to eventually lead to his release by breaking the 66 seals. In the episode "Sin City", he was described as the 'father' and God of the demons, the one who gave them their form and purpose. Azazel reinforced this by referring to him as "My Father" while possessing a priest before slaughtering a convent of nuns. However, in "Abandon All Hope ...", Crowley remarks that Lucifer views demons with contempt and his cannon fodder and will destroy them once he has eliminated humanity.

In the episode "The End", Lucifer states his fall was the result of refusing God's decree to love humans more than him. As a result, God had Michael cast him into hell. Ruby also reveals in "When the Levee Breaks" in defiance to God, he turned Lilith into the first demon. Both Death and Gabriel have compared Lucifer's hatred of humans to "one big temper tantrum!" because God favored humans over him, his most beloved angel. Lucifer does not like how humans have changed the planet from its original state and hopes to purify it. He is also very critical of humans, mostly in how they blame him for their own mistakes, wrongdoings, flaws and failures. Creator Eric Kripke has jokingly compared him to a "raging psychotic" version of environmentalist Ed Begley Jr. with "unlimited power".

Due to his angelic and spiritual nature, Lucifer needs a human vessel in order to interact directly with the physical world. Lucifer seeks out a man named Nick, whose wife and baby had recently been murdered. As revealed in Season 14's "Damaged Goods," Lucifer himself arranged for the murders through the demon Abraxas so that he could manipulate Nick. Tormenting Nick about the tragedy, he casts illusions such as a baby crying and blood pouring from the crib, eventually appearing to Nick in the form of his late wife Sarah. Openly admitting his identity to Nick, he tries to gain sympathy by telling Nick he was punished for loving God too much. He then convinces Nick to be his vessel by promising to get vengeance against God for allowing his family to be murdered. However, Lucifer later reveals to Sam that he is the true intended vessel. By "Abandon All Hope..." it is shown Nick's body, being a temporary vessel and not his "true" vessel, is incapable of containing Lucifer's immense power and is beginning to wear down; revealed in "Two Minutes to Midnight" he has to consume gallons of demon blood to keep his vessel from combusting. He forms a ritual to summon Death and when the Winchesters, Harville's and Castiel arrive, he traps Castiel in holy oil and sends Meg after the others. After being ambushed by the brothers he is shot with the Colt but survives; he then reveals his status as one of five things in creation immune to the Colt; while the brothers escape with Castiel's help, he manages to summon Death and bind him under his control.

During a convention of pagan gods in "Hammer of the Gods", Lucifer is made aware of the brothers' location by Mercury, who betrays the rest of them. Slaughtering all the gods, he approaches the brothers and is stalled by Kali until Gabriel arrives. Gabriel provides safe passage for Kali and the brothers, and confronts Lucifer about his ultimate reason for rebellion, claiming that he rebelled not because he recognized that humans were flawed, but because he was no longer their father's favorite son. Lucifer questions Gabriel's loyalties, but he replies that he believes — by virtue of his experiences with them — humans, despite their flaws, strive to do their best. Ultimately, Lucifer kills Gabriel with his own sword when Gabriel's attempt to catch Lucifer off-guard with a duplicate fail, but he is clearly distraught over this.

Having acquired all four rings of the Horseman (which can trap Lucifer back in his prison), Sam and Dean enter Lucifer's hideout, planning to trap him when Sam agrees to be his vessel; this completely fails, as Lucifer is too powerful to fight. Lucifer brings forward four demons, who had been part of Azazel's surveillance of Sam since his youth and kills them all in a way of "letting off steam" and acquiring Sam's trust. Following that, he confronts Michael in a graveyard, attempting to convince him not to fight, reasoning there was no real purpose, Michael refuses. Dean interrupts, while Castiel dissipates Michael, an act Lucifer took unkindly to, and kills him. He starts to pummel Dean and when Bobby attempts to use the Colt to stop him he is killed as well. However, Sam then sees a toy army man in an ashtray of the Impala, a remnant from his youth, and regains control. Sam reopens the hole, and jumps in, taking Michael with him.

Lucifer returns in Season 7 as part of Sam's hallucinations, caused by the memories of his time in the cage. Lucifer tells Sam that the world he has been in for the last year is not real and Sam is still in the cage, a new form of torture which Lucifer prides himself on as being his best yet. Sam confronts Lucifer and asks him why he does not end this dream world to which Lucifer responds by saying that he will only end it when Sam cannot take it anymore. Lucifer later changes into Dean and tricks Sam into leaving Bobby's house. Once at the destination, he reveals himself to prove he can control Sam's "dream", although Lucifer is proven to be a hallucination when Dean tells Sam how to figure out what is real. Despite being proven to be a hallucination, he informs Sam that he is not going anywhere. Lucifer tortures Sam by depriving him of sleep by repeatedly waking him up and later making food look like maggots in an attempt to kill him. Although Sam initially manages to ignore the hallucination, it becomes worse when Sam acknowledges Lucifer's advice when trying to get information about Dean's whereabouts, giving the hallucination additional strength. Castiel, found to be alive, tries to rebuild Sam's mental wall, but fails as it is completely gone. In order to save Sam and atone for what he has done, Castiel transfers the problem to himself, leaving him haunted by Lucifer and stuck in a mental hospital. In "Reading is Fundamental," when Castiel comes out of his catatonic state, Sam asks him about seeing Lucifer. Castiel explains that he did at first, but Lucifer eventually disappeared. Castiel believes that Lucifer was simply a projection of Sam's own torment from his time in Hell and that projection disappeared as the torment was no longer in Sam's mind.

In the season eight episode "Goodbye Stranger", it is revealed that Lucifer had a series of crypts around the United States and possibly the world containing his most precious artifacts. The locations were only known to Lucifer himself and his most trusted followers, such as Azazel. Among the items in his crypts, in an angel-proofed box, was the angel Word of God tablet. Eventually Sam, Dean and Castiel locate the right crypt with the help of Meg who knows from her time with Azazel and get the angel tablet.

In the Season 10 episode "Brother's Keeper", Death explains that Lucifer and the other archangels once fought a war with an ancient evil called the Darkness, eventually locking it away. Lucifer was given the Mark of Cain, the lock on the Darkness' prison and the Mark corrupted him into his jealousy towards humanity, leading to his fall into evil. The first mention of Lucifer (and Michael)'s activity since their imprisonment in Hell is mentioned in "Out of the Darkness, Into the Fire" when an aide of Crowley informs him that ever since the Darkness broke free of its prison, the two archangels are screaming, trying to tell others about the danger the Darkness will pose to the world.

In "Oh Brother Where Art Thou?" and "The Devil in the Details", Sam travels into Hell to speak to Lucifer, directed by what he believes to be visions from God. Manifesting in the form of Nick, Lucifer is summoned into a smaller cage in Hell where he tells Sam he can defeat the Darkness, but needs Sam to be his vessel again. After the warding suddenly fails, Lucifer teleports Sam into the cage and reveals that he sent the visions to Sam after the Darkness' release damaged his cage and is working with Rowena. Lucifer shows Sam several memories, explaining that while Sam once had the strength to do what needed to be done, he lost that after Dean went to Purgatory. Sam accepts that Lucifer is telling the truth, but refuses to agree to possession again as he knows no matter who wins, Lucifer or the Darkness, humanity is doomed. Lucifer engages Sam, Dean and Castiel in battle, proving to be more than a match for all three together. After Lucifer confirms he can defeat the Darkness, Castiel agrees to possession by him. At that same moment, Rowena completes a spell that apparently banishes Lucifer back to his cage. After the Winchesters leave, Lucifer possessing Castiel reveals himself to Rowena and Crowley and kills Rowena so she cannot send him back to the cage.

In "Into the Mystic", Dean finds Lucifer looking through the bunker for a way to summon the Darkness and confides in him about his connection to Amara, believing Lucifer to be Castiel. Lucifer consoles Dean on the connection while secretly interested in this development.

In "The Vessel", Lucifer has regained control of Hell and keeps Crowley as his pet. After receiving a call from the Winchesters, he is shocked to discover that one of the Hands of God survived and agrees to transport Dean back to a submarine in 1943 to get it before the sub sinks. Special warding keeps Lucifer out of the sub and he and Sam attempt to find a way to remove the warding. Sam finds a spell, but does not believe it will work as it requires the power of an archangel. As Sam offers his soul to help give "Castiel" the power he needs, Lucifer reveals himself and attempts to destroy Sam. Castiel regains control temporarily, but is unable to eject Lucifer as it is taking all of his strength to keep Lucifer from killing Sam and only Lucifer has the power to rescue Dean. As Delphine Seydoux unleashes the power of the Hand of God, Lucifer pulls Dean back to the present and reveals himself to Dean. Lucifer throws Dean around the bunker and attempts to use the power of the Hand of God, but finds it expended. As Lucifer advances on Dean, Sam uses a blood sigil to banish him from the bunker.

Following his banishment, Lucifer attempts to find another Hand of God through Crowley in "Beyond the Mat". To this end, he sets Crowley up to be "freed" by Lucifer's loyal demon Simmonds so Crowley will lead him to another Hand of God. Crowley leads Lucifer to the Rod of Aaron but anticipates Lucifer's double-cross. Crowley attempts to kill Lucifer with the Rod's power, but Simmonds takes the brunt of the blast, saving Lucifer. Realizing the Rod's power is expended, Crowley quickly teleports away before Lucifer can kill him. In "Hell's Angel", Lucifer enters Heaven, killing an angel he finds there and intimidates the angels into following him to combat Amara. Amara unleashes a wave of darkness through Heaven, frightening the angels and pushing them closer to following Lucifer. However, the Winchesters, Crowley and the still-alive Rowena team up together to free Castiel and banish Lucifer back to his Cage. To this end, they summon him into warding in a church surrounded by Holy Fire. Once Lucifer is trapped, Dean attempts to use magic to suppress the archangel to restore Castiel, but Lucifer quickly overpowers it. In a desperate attempt, Crowley enters Castiel's vessel where he finds that Lucifer has "really gotten his hooks in good" to Castiel who is apathetic to everything around him even as Lucifer appears in the form of Nick and attacks Crowley. Sam exorcises Crowley to save his life and the warding breaks, releasing Lucifer. Lucifer is able to get the Horn of Joshua from the Winchesters, another Hand of God, just before Amara appears. Lucifer blasts Amara with both his own power and the Horn's to no avail. Amara then captures Lucifer and takes him to a grain silo she is using as her base. Believing Lucifer to be the one thing God still cares about, Amara begins torturing him in hopes of drawing God out.

Over the next few weeks, Amara tortures Lucifer mercilessly, trying and failing to draw out God. In "All in the Family", Amara notices that Lucifer is in bad shape along with Castiel and contacts Dean to pass on the message to God. Having learned that God intends to sacrifice Himself to Amara to save the universe, the Winchesters, Metatron and Prophet Donatello Redfern team up together to rescue Lucifer, hoping to convince God to use Lucifer in battle against Amara. As Dean distracts Amara, Sam, Metatron and Donatello find the heavily injured Lucifer who agrees to set aside his differences with God and fight Amara with them. They set him free, but he is too weakened to teleport them to safety. As Amara approaches, Metatron sacrifices himself to buy them time to get away, but Amara quickly catches up to them. Before she can kill the group, God teleports them and the Impala into the Bunker. There, for the first time in millennia, God and Lucifer are reunited. After commenting on how much each other has changed, God heals Lucifer's injuries to the fallen archangel's surprise.

In "We Happy Few", Lucifer sulks around the Bunker, displeased to be reunited with God who will not apologize to him. Fed up with the two's issues with each other, the Winchesters get God and Lucifer to have a sit-down in which things are tense at first but the two eventually reconcile. Now fully on their side, Lucifer joins God in explaining that the last time they defeated the Darkness, it had taken the four archangels and God to barely win and this time Michael is in no shape to battle and Gabriel and Raphael are dead and God cannot resurrect them. As a result, the Winchesters suggest pulling in the witches, angels and demons to help them. As God refuses to order the angels to help, Lucifer returns to Heaven where the angels refuse to hear him out. In response, Lucifer returns control to Castiel who tells the angels that Lucifer is burning both himself and his vessel out but he feels his role in the battle is to give Lucifer form on Earth to fight. Castiel and Lucifer are able to convince the angels to join them and Sam and Dean are able to convince the witches and demons respectively. After the witches, angels and demons strike Amara, she enters the warehouse where the Winchesters, God and Lucifer are waiting for her and Lucifer strikes Amara through the back with an angelic spear. Due to her weakened state, Lucifer's strike brings Amara down and she and God confront each other. However, God waits too long to transfer the Mark of Cain to Sam and Amara recovers and attacks God with all of her power. Lucifer attempts to save his father, but Amara flings him against a pillar and yanks him out of Castiel, while leaving Castiel unconscious. In "Alpha and Omega", Dean goes to check on Lucifer only to find Castiel alone. Castiel tells him that Lucifer is gone from his vessel, but he does not know what happened to the archangel after Amara pulled him out.

In "Keep Calm and Carry On", a weakened Lucifer searches for a suitable new vessel chased by Crowley but keeps burning out the people he is possessing. In "Mamma Mia", Lucifer settles on aging rock star Vince Vincente (Rick Springfield) and gains permission by posing as Vince's dead lover. With a new permanent vessel, Lucifer meets with Crowley who works with Rowena in an attempt to force Lucifer from Vince and back into the Cage. However, the effort fails, and Crowley flees while Lucifer captures Rowena. In The Foundry, Lucifer attempts to have Rowena make Vince a permanent vessel for him, but she betrays Lucifer and casts a spell that speeds up Vince's decay and banishes Lucifer to the bottom of the ocean. In "Rock Never Dies", a pair of amateur Satanists attempt to summon Lucifer who appears in the decaying body of Vince. Lucifer was actually summoned by one of his feathers they had and kills the Satanists then uses the feather to repair his vessel temporarily. Posing as Vince, Lucifer organizes a concert to murder a lot of people and is confronted by the Winchesters, Crowley and Castiel who are unable to defeat him. Lucifer explains to them that he feels that God only made up with him to defeat the Darkness and has abandoned him once more. Lucifer no longer has a plan except to destroy everything he wants and vacates Vince as his body burns out. In "LOTUS", Lucifer begins possessing people of influence, ultimately possessing President of the United States Jefferson Rooney. As the President, Lucifer sends the Secret Service after the Winchesters and engages in sex with Rooney's mistress Kelly, resulting in her becoming pregnant with his child. Crowley kidnaps Kelly who tricks Lucifer to a motel where the Winchesters, Castiel, Crowley and Rowena are waiting for him. After using a sigil to weaken Lucifer, Sam activates a device created by the British Men of Letters that can exorcise any angel or demon from their vessel. Despite Lucifer's attempts to resist, he is exorcised from Rooney and Rowena casts a spell that apparently returns Lucifer to his cage.

At SDCC 2016, it was affirmed that all Lucifer wants is a "vacation", being tired after ruling both Heaven and Hell, and happy that he finally reconciled with his father.

It is soon revealed that Lucifer was not banished back to the Cage but was actually transferred back into Nick; Crowley retrieved Nick's corpse and had a team of demons' 'repair' him, turning Nick into a new Cage where Lucifer cannot leave his vessel and can only use his powers on Crowley's orders. Lucifer is eventually able to turn the tables on Crowley and escape his captivity (although he is still apparently trapped in Nick), with the Winchesters' attempts to stop him banishing him to a parallel universe where the Apocalypse took place because Dean and Sam were never born, although Lucifer is confronted by Crowley who kills himself to trap him, he is able to kill Castiel and take Mary with him. While the Winchesters try to 'raise' Lucifer's son Jack- who grew to adulthood immediately after birth-, Jack is able to help Castiel come back to life, but Lucifer remains in the other world and alerts the alternate Michael to his existence, prompting him to fight alt-Michael but he is defeated. While imprisoned, Alt-Michael drains his powers and tells him of his plans to travel to the 'prime' universe to conquer it as well. Faced with this threat, Lucifer uses a ritual performed by Michael to return to his world to warn them about Michael, but Castiel initially disbelieves him before they are captured by Asmodeus though escape. Lucifer takes control of Heaven since there are too few angels to mount an effective resistance to Michael. Later, he abandons it to find his son and has no luck.

During "Beat the Devil", he drowns his sorrows before he is captured again but by Gabriel and Rowena who survived his attempts on their lives. His grace is used to power the rift and keep it open. Lucifer learns from a taunting Rowena his son is in that world and breaks free. Lucifer's attempt on her life ends up sending him to Apocalypse World where he resurrects Sam who was killed by vampires, having used the grace of Michael's soldiers to refuel himself. He forces Sam to help him form a bond with his son. Lucifer met his son for the first time.

During "Exodus", Lucifer bonds with Jack and is reluctantly allowed to join the team, revealing that they have thirty-one hours before the rift closes again and killing six attacking angels. During this time, Lucifer's efforts to paint himself in a better light are rebuffed by Gabriel who compares his older brother to a cancer that God had to cut out to protect humanity, but too late. Gabriel's words reduce Lucifer to silent tears. Lucifer later works with Dean to repair an old bus and then drives the bus full of refugees back to the rift. When Michael appears and attacks during the exodus through the rift, Lucifer attacks him, but is easily beaten. Following Gabriel's death at Michael's hands, an injured and weakened Lucifer tries to follow Sam through the rift but is thrown to the ground by the younger Winchester and abandoned to die. With the rift closed, Lucifer makes a deal with Michael to share the spell to reopen it in exchange for Lucifer getting to take Jack while Michael gets everything else.

In the Season 13 finale "Let the Good Times Roll", Lucifer reappears in the Winchesters' universe and entices Jack to leave for the stars with him. At the request of Jack, Lucifer resurrects his friend Maggie who subsequently identifies Lucifer as her killer. During a confrontation with Michael, Lucifer's deal with the other archangel is revealed as is his murder of Maggie. Lucifer is forced to admit the truth by Jack who rejects his father after seeing his true nature. Enraged, Lucifer absorbs his son's grace to become more powerful than ever. With Lucifer virtually unstoppable and poised to destroy everything, Dean agrees to become the vessel of the alternate Michael on the condition that Michael power him to battle Lucifer. Powered by Michael, Dean battles Lucifer who still proves to be more than a match for Dean. However, as Lucifer tries to smite Dean, Sam is able to toss Dean the Archangel Blade, the one weapon that can kill an archangel. Armed with the blade, Dean is able to finally kill Lucifer by stabbing him in the heart. However, in the aftermath of Lucifer's death, Michael betrays his deal with Dean, takes full control of him and disappears.

In Season 14's "Stranger in a Strange Land," Lucifer's vessel Nick is revealed to have survived Lucifer's death. Nick has nightmares and flashbacks to his time as Lucifer's vessel and a slowly healing wound in his side where Lucifer was stabbed. Sam and Mary both have trouble looking at Nick due to his time under Lucifer's control, but he is able to tell Sam that Michael had told Lucifer that he wants to "do it right this time" when discussing his plans for the Winchesters' world. Nick subsequently shows Lucifer-like behaviors when angered in "Gods and Monsters," causing Castiel to suspect that Lucifer did more damage to Nick's psyche than was previously realized.

In "Unhuman Nature," Nick's bloody quest for revenge leads to him becoming a serial killer. After killing Frank Kellogg, the man who was possessed by the demon Abraxas when Abraxas murdered his family, Nick prays to Lucifer, having realized that he enjoyed being the archangel's vessel and the freedom that came with it. In response to Nick's prayer, a figure with glowing red eyes rises in the Empty, presumably Lucifer himself, somehow awakened from his eternal sleep by Nick's prayer.

In "Damaged Goods," Nick manages to track down the demon Abraxas who murdered his family. During a confrontation, Abraxas reveals to a shocked Nick that it was in fact Lucifer himself who ordered the death of Nick's family at Abraxas's hands. Abraxas tells Nick that while he was chosen, Nick was nothing special and that "we threw a dart at the phone book" to choose Nick. The enraged Nick then kills Abraxas with an angel blade in revenge for his family's murders. During the confrontation, despite previously being loyal to Lucifer, the demon shows no real care that Lucifer is dead, simply responding that it is "cool" when Nick tells Abraxas who is also amused that Nick is no longer under the control of Lucifer.

In "Prophet and Loss," Nick begins seeking out Lucifer to reunite with him. In "Game Night," Nick kidnaps prophet Donatello Redfield and boosting Donatello's abilities with angel grace, communicates with the awakened Lucifer in the Empty. Lucifer provides Nick with a way to resurrect him using his son's blood. Nick succeeds in getting the blood and performs the spell, opening a portal to the Empty from which Lucifer emerges in the form of a viscous black humanoid figure with wings. However, Jack arrives with Mary Winchester, kills Nick and banishes Lucifer back to the Empty.

In "Absence" and "Jack in the Box," Jack is haunted by a hallucination of Lucifer, the form that his subconscious takes after Jack accidentally kills Mary.

In Season 15's "Proverbs 17:3," Sam experiences a vision, part of a series of nightmares he has been having, featuring Lucifer possessing him and wearing a white suit much as Lucifer did in "The End." Dean attempts to kill the archangel with the Colt, but Lucifer is unharmed by the shot and burns Dean to death after stating that they both always knew it had to end this way. Sam later comes to the conclusion that he is witnessing Chuck's possible endings for them. In "The Trap," this is revealed to be the Lucifer of an alternate reality with Chuck explaining that what Sam actually witnessed were Chuck's memories of alternate Sam's and Deans.

In the series' penultimate episode "Inherit the Earth," a resurrected Lucifer appears at the bunker, claiming that the Shadow brought him back to help the Winchesters defeat God. As proof, Lucifer kills Betty, a Reaper, so that she will become the new Death and can read Chuck's Death book. However, once Betty has the book open, Lucifer kills her and reveals that it was actually God who brought him back to get the book and that Lucifer is God's new favorite. Lucifer engages in a brief battle with Michael that ends when Michael manages to kill Lucifer with an Archangel Blade that Sam provides him. This time, Lucifer explodes into ash and leaves no remains behind. Sam and Dean later explain to Chuck that Jack absorbed the power from Michael and Lucifer's battle and Lucifer's second death and that Michael's reaction to Lucifer's claims allowed them to put their ultimate plan together.

A homage to John Milton's Paradise Lost, Lucifer will be portrayed as "gentle, almost sympathetic". Kripke reasoned, "He was essentially betrayed, so in some ways he can be viewed sympathetically ... if we can make the angels dicks, Lucifer can be sympathetic." Kripke further characterized him as a "Devil who has doubt" and "a lot of affection for God and the angels", and who "speaks really tenderly and gently and...doesn't lie".

Pellegrino was the second choice to play the angel Castiel, losing the role to Misha Collins.

Metatron
Metatron (Curtis Armstrong) is the angel who wrote the Word of God tablets. According to the demon tablet, he is an Archangel, but Metatron himself claims to be an angel from the secretarial division who was enlisted by God to write the tablets before he left Heaven. God later claims that there was no special reason he chose Metatron, that Metatron was just the closest angel to the door when he walked in. When God left and the Archangels decided to take over everything, Metatron left Heaven and hid on Earth, cutting himself off completely to protect himself and the tablets as he rightly assumed that the Archangels would need him to fulfil their plans. On Earth, Metatron lived among a Native American tribe known as The Two Rivers who he gave immortality in exchange for stories and books. Metatron became enamored by human stories and even though he read as much as an angel is capable of, he has not been able to read every story written during the past few millennia he has spent on Earth.

Sam and Dean first learn of Metatron when they uncover the Leviathan Word of God tablet and Castiel reveals Metatron wrote them. At the time, Dean considers looking for him for help with the Leviathans. Later, Kevin Tran finds a personal note Metatron left on the demon tablet revealing that there is a compendium of tablets. While trying to find the third trial to close Hell, Sam and Dean track down Metatron and confront him. Metatron initially refuses to help, but after they reveal the story of Kevin Tran, Metatron rescues him from Crowley and heals him. Metatron now knows what is going on in Heaven and the world and agrees to help and along with Kevin, reveals the third trial: curing a demon. He also suggests to Dean that closing Hell may not be the best idea, telling him he needs to consider the impact it will have on the world. Metatron later approaches Castiel to seek his help in dealing with the problems in Heaven. Heaven has degenerated into all-out war between various factions and Metatron wants to seal it up. As the Scribe of God, he knows the three trials without the angel tablet, but wants Castiel to do them. The two set out to complete the first trial which is to kill a Nephilim and cut out their heart. Though Castiel hesitates, when the Nephilim overpowers both himself and Metatron, he kills her from behind while she is distracted with Metatron. In "Sacrifice," Metatron reveals that the second trial is to get the bow of a Cupid and as he works with Castiel to get it, he is captured by Naomi. Metatron recognizes Naomi as the angel that was supposed to "debrief" him for the Archangels after God left, in reality to get his secrets from his mind. Suspicious of why Metatron has suddenly come out of hiding, Naomi tortures him for information and is shocked to learn that he actually intends to expel all angels from Heaven except himself as revenge for his own expulsion. Naomi rushes off to warn Dean and Castiel, but while she is gone, Metatron breaks free and kills Naomi when she returns. He captures Castiel and takes his Grace as the final component needed for his spell then sends him to Earth to live a human life after asking Castiel to find him and tell him about it when he one day dies. Metatron's plan works and all angels are expelled from Heaven. Sam and Dean learn in "Heaven Can't Wait" that Metatron designed the spell to be irreversible and there is apparently no way to put the angels back in Heaven.

Metatron eventually reappears on Earth in the episode "Holy Terror" during the struggle of the various angel factions to wrest control and decide the best course to retake and re-enter Heaven. In that time, he convinces Gadreel to join him in the refashioning of the angels' purpose in existence, resulting in Kevin Tran's death and Gadreel's taking full control of Sam's body. In "Road Trip," he employs Gadreel as his assassin, sending him to kill angel guard Thaddeus and Gadreel's friend Abner, presumably as a further test of his loyalty. He is also annoyed by Gadreel not killing Dean and questioning his orders. Metatron waits for Gadreel to return from killing Abner in a bar for hours with Gadreel's former vessel and is surprised when Gadreel suddenly appears in his natural form and repossesses his old vessel. Realizing that Sam has expelled Gadreel, an amused Metatron asks if Gadreel had Winchester troubles. After getting the tablets, Metatron connects himself to the angel tablet, granting him God-like power. Continuing his efforts with Gadreel's help, Metatron recruits a following and begins writing his own epic "story" about how things will go. To this end he captures Castiel during "Meta Fiction" and asks him to be the villain in the story in exchange for an unlimited supply of grace as his stolen grace is burning out. Castiel refuses and Metatron is forced to trade Castiel for Gadreel after Sam and Dean capture the latter. With his new powers, Metatron proves immune to their efforts to trap them and lets them go as he does not see them as a threat though he is undeterred by this setback. Following this, Castiel gathers his own following to battle Metatron who has Gadreel eliminate other angels who could be a threat to him. As Castiel's following grows stronger than his own, Metatron uses brainwashed suicide bombers in "Stairway to Heaven" to convince the other angels that Castiel is not who they should follow. Metatron offers the angels a return to Heaven through a moving portal he has created in return for their fealty to him. After Castiel refuses to kill Dean for supposedly killing the Reaper Tessa, Castiel's followers abandon him for Metatron. However, it also backfires on Metatron in that his methods cause Gadreel to switch sides too. During "Do You Believe In Miracles?", after broadcasting to all angels over "angel radio", Metatron heads to Earth to convert humanity to following him instead of God by performing various miracles including raising the dead. Dean, armed with the First Blade and powered by the Mark of Cain confronts Metatron as Castiel and Gadreel try to break into Heaven and shatter Metatron's power. With his new power, Metatron proves too powerful for Dean and mortally wounds him. However, before he can finish the job, Gadreel's sacrifice allows Castiel to shatter the angel tablet and Metatron's incredible power, forcing him to flee an attack by Sam. In Heaven, Metatron binds Castiel and taunts him about how the angels are all sheep who will follow him and how he does not really care about them. However, Castiel had secretly activated the broadcasting equipment in Metatron's office, causing him to broadcast the truth to all angels. Metatron's own followers turn on and overpower him, but Castiel locks him in Heaven's dungeon rather than kill him. At the same time, his killing of Dean causes him to resurrect as a demon.

In "Reichenbach", Hannah approaches Metatron to see if he has any of Castiel's grace left in hopes of saving him from dying when his stolen grace burns out. Metatron claims there is some left and offers to hand it over in exchange for his freedom, claiming that he will leave the planet if set free. Castiel refuses however and Metatron reveals that he really plans to get revenge once he escapes, though he claims there is some grace left. In "The Hunter Games", hoping that Metatron knows of a cure to the Mark, Castiel has him brought to Earth where he and the Winchesters question him for information. Metatron claims there is a cure to the Mark and that it requires the First Blade, but when Dean demands the rest, he reveals that there is a lot of steps and he wants something for each one. Dean tortures Metatron who continues to taunt him into giving in to the Mark's rage, but he is stopped by Castiel and Sam before he can kill him. Castiel returns Metatron to Heaven for safety with Metatron saying that he will choose death over helping again. However, he leaves a possible clue: "behold, the river shall end at the source." In "Inside Man", desperate to find a cure for Dean's deteriorating condition, Sam, Castiel and Bobby Singer plot to break Metatron out of prison when the angels refuse to release him to their custody for fear of what he will do if released. On Earth, Metatron taunts them with his leverage over them until Castiel removes his grace, leaving Metatron human and mortal. After Sam shoots him in the leg and Castiel threatens his life, Metatron quickly gives in and admits that he knows of no cure for the Mark, stating that it is God-level or Lucifer-level power and he knows nothing and that not even the tablets contain information on the Mark. Castiel is able to tell that Metatron is telling the truth, but before Sam can kill him, Metatron tells them that he was telling the truth about there being some of Castiel's grace left and offers to lead him to it in exchange for his life. Castiel reluctantly agrees and sets off in search of his grace with Metatron. In "Book of the Damned", Metatron and Castiel go on a road trip to find Castiel's grace. Metatron starts to embrace his new humanity, annoying Castiel with his antics and leading to Metatron getting punched. At a diner, they come under attack by an angry Cupid and Metatron kills him to save Castiel but fails to endear himself to Castiel with his actions. Finally, the two come to a library where Metatron reveals he had another angel hide the grace and leave him clues so no one else could find it or torture the information from him. Searching through the books for one with the title "what's the most insane thing a man can do?", Metatron engages Castiel in a conversation, asking him what he will do once he tracks down the remaining rogue angels as Hannah has restored order to Heaven. While Castiel is distracted, Metatron uses his blood to cast a spell that stuns Castiel and retrieves the demon tablet, what he had really come for. However, he discovers that Castiel has found his grace in a copy of Don Quixote and quickly leaves before he can recover. Castiel gets his grace back and is restored to full power, but he and Sam are left worried by what Metatron can do with the demon tablet despite now being human. They also lie to Dean about how Castiel got his grace back, telling him that Hannah got it out of Metatron and not mentioning his escape. It is later mentioned he got away by stealing Castiel's car.

In "Out of the Darkness, Into the Fire" and "Into the Void", the other angels are searching for Metatron to imprison him again while in "The Bad Seed", the Winchesters and Castiel reluctantly search for him hoping he has information on The Darkness. To their surprise, they can find no incidents with Castiel's car that indicate that Metatron got in an accident or even got a ticket, surprising Castiel as he did not expect a former angel and shut-in to be a good driver. In "Our Little World", Castiel spots Metatron's reflection in a camera shot of a murder on the news, revealing that Metatron has become a videographer. Castiel tracks Metatron down at the scene of a shooting where Metatron steals the victim's money and bemoans his lack of power which he would not have used to help the man anyway. After healing the man and breaking Metatron's camera, Castiel drags him to an abandoned warehouse where Metatron tells him he has come to see reality as the new literature and himself as the "author of reality" in his job as a videographer. Metatron tries to lie about the location of the demon tablet, but Castiel has already found it by simply searching Metatron's apartment where he had it hidden under his mattress. Castiel demands information on the Darkness and while Metatron knows something, he refuses to tell Castiel and taunts him into attacking Metatron. Castiel stops when he realizes that Metatron wants to die and Metatron explains that he cannot stand being human. He finally tells Castiel that the Darkness is God's sister who He had to give up to form creation. Castiel lets Metatron go, telling Sam and Dean that he is now a human and a pitiable one at that and is no threat anymore. If Metatron draws any sort of attention to himself, the angels will descend on him and destroy him for his actions.

Months later in "Don't Call Me Shurley", Metatron is living as a homeless vagrant but has gained a more compassionate nature as demonstrated by him feeding a stray dog food he found in a dumpster rather than eating it himself. Metatron and his dog are transported to a bar where Metatron meets with Prophet Chuck Shurley who reveals himself to in fact be God. God does not punish Metatron for his rogue actions, though He also refuses to restore Metatron to being an angel, something Metatron admits is probably a good thing. Instead, God asks Metatron to help Him write His autobiography. Metatron helps God work on the autobiography and is stunned by how apathetic God has become to the world and the situation with Amara. After learning that Amara has infected a town with an infection of insanity, Metatron pleads with God to help, now understanding that humanity is God's greatest creation and is better than God because humans have many flaws, but they still try. God apparently refuses to listen, but Metatron reads the end of his autobiography and is shocked by what he reads while God intervenes to stop Amara's infection and to save the Winchesters. In "All in the Family", Metatron contacts the Winchesters and warns them that God intends to sacrifice himself to Amara in an attempt to save the universe. Wanting to do whatever he can to save God and humanity, Metatron offers the Winchesters whatever help he can give them and joins Sam and the Prophet Donatello in a rescue mission for Lucifer. As Sam and Lucifer discuss the situation, Metatron casts a spell to release Lucifer from his bindings, but Lucifer is incapable of teleporting them to safety. As Amara approaches, Sam, Lucifer and Donatello flee but Metatron stays behind to hold off Amara and buy them time. Metatron unsuccessfully uses an angel banishing sigil on an amused Amara and asks her to spare the universe as God had only meant well. Telling Metatron "spare this", Amara surrounds Metatron in darkness and implodes him into nothingness. After being informed of Metatron's death, Dean admits he is surprised Metatron sacrificed himself for them.

Michael
Michael is the oldest and most powerful Archangel, featured in Season 5 of Supernatural. In the premiere of Season 5, Zachariah reveals the angels' plan for Michael to use Dean as his vessel and kill Lucifer once and for all. However, Dean needs to give his consent to be the vessel. Michael refers to Lucifer as his younger brother and when Lucifer refused God's command to bow before humanity, he turned to Michael for support, but was refused. On God's command, Michael cast Lucifer into Hell. Michael first appears when Sam, Dean, and Castiel have traveled back to 1977 to stop Anna from killing John and Mary in order to prevent Sam's birth, and thus his use as Lucifer's vessel. When the angels develop a new plan to lure Dean into consenting in "Point of No Return", the angels bring back Adam, John Winchester's third son, under the pretense that he can be Michael's new vessel, but this is merely a ruse to get Dean to say yes. Zachariah tortures Sam and Adam until Dean consents. Zachariah then summons Michael from Heaven, but Dean changes his mind, kills Zachariah and attempts to escape. Adam is inadvertently locked inside while Michael descends, and the room and Adam disappear. In "Two Minutes to Midnight", Castiel confirmed that now Michael is taking Adam as his vessel. During the episode "Swan Song", Michael appears with Adam as his vessel in order to fight Lucifer, but gets interrupted by Dean, Bobby, and Castiel, who delay him by sending him away with holy fire. In a couple of minutes he returns to see Sam, who has taken control over Lucifer, ready to jump in the pit, and tries to stop him, claiming his destiny is to fight his brother. As Sam denies, Michael makes a final desperate effort to hold him, but is swept along by Sam and they fall into the abyss together. Castiel believes that he and Lucifer tortured Sam's soul in the cage until it was removed by Death, one of the horsemen. Michael's first mention of activity since his imprisonment in Hell is mentioned in "Out of the Darkness, Into the Fire", in which an aide of Crowley informs him that Michael is wailing, trying to tell others about the danger the Darkness, which recently broke free from its prison, will pose to the world. In "The Devil in the Details", Lucifer tells Sam that "prison life" has not agreed with Michael and indicates that Michael's time in the Cage has driven him insane. When talking about their coming battle with the Darkness, God echoes this, telling the Winchesters that Michael is in no shape to fight a battle.

In Season 15's "Back and to the Future," the demon Belphegor tells Dean that every door in Hell was opened by God, including that of Lucifer's Cage. Concerned, Dean asks about Michael and Belphegor tells Dean that last he heard, Michael was just sitting in the Cage. However, Belphegor suggests that if Michael does get out, he will want revenge.

In "Our Father, Who Aren't In Heaven," the Winchesters and Castiel learn from the demon tablet that God has a secret weakness that he only shared with his favorite. Suspecting this to be Michael, they decide to travel into Hell to speak with him with Dean suspecting that God and Lucifer had lied about Michael's insanity. However, by this point, Michael has already escaped from both the Cage and Hell and returned to Earth where, still in the body of Adam Milligan, he shares control with his vessel and has developed a close bond with him. With the other archangels dead and God gone, Michael decides to start a new life with Adam on Earth, dispatching Lilith when the demon arrives to take him to God. After Castiel prays to him, Michael agrees to meet with his brother, though he is less than pleased to see the other angel given Castiel's role in his imprisonment in the Cage. The Winchesters and Castiel take Michael captive and attempt to convince him that God is the threat and they need Michael's help to stop him. Even with Adam, who reveals that he and Michael reached an understanding in the Cage, helping, Michael refuses to listen as it would mean God's Favorite Son doubting him. In a final effort, Castiel shows Michael his own memories of God's betrayals, including the battle with the Darkness, the murder of Lucifer's son Jack and the Apocalypse World Michael. Completely disillusioned, Michael provides Castiel and Dean with the spell to trap God but warns that it requires a flower that only grows in Purgatory. Michael opens a twelve-hour portal for them to Purgatory but refuses to stay and help. Dean releases the archangel, who allows Adam to take control again so that Dean can apologize to his brother before Adam and Michael leave.

In "Inherit the Earth," the Winchesters and Jack find Michael on an otherwise empty Earth. Michael reveals that Adam was killed when God wiped out everyone else. He also says he was shocked to learn many humans loved God. Michael then reveals this to be the result of him having angels and prophets propagandize his father as loving and caring. He then agrees to help them against God. However, not even Michael can open Chuck's Death book. Shortly afterwards, Michael is enraged by the presence of a resurrected Lucifer who eventually reveals that God brought him back to get the book and that Michael's no longer God's favorite. Michael and Lucifer engage in a brief battle that ends with Michael killing his brother with an Archangel Blade provided to him by Sam. Michael joins the Winchesters and Jack in their plan to use a spell from the Book of the Damned to kill God but betrays them in an effort to become his father's favorite once again. However, Chuck is enraged that Michael betrayed him earlier and effortlessly obliterates the archangel. Sam and Dean subsequently reveal that they had earlier anticipated Michael's betrayal and used Michael to lure Chuck into a trap for their real plan.

Apocalypse World Michael
In Season 13, an alternate reality version of Michael is depicted in Apocalypse World portrayed by Christian Keyes, Ruth Connell and Jensen Ackles. This version of Michael won the Apocalypse when it occurred, killing his version of Lucifer. Now a twisted and corrupt version of what he once was, Michael rules Apocalypse World with an iron fist and is waging a war of genocide upon the human race. Lucifer himself calls this Michael "pure evil", which is a lot coming from him. More powerful than the Michael the Winchesters are used to, he captures Lucifer and Mary Winchester and tortures them. Learning of the Winchesters' world, Michael intends to lead an invasion to destroy the human population and take over that world as well. An attempt to open a door between the worlds with the help of the Prophet Kevin Tran allows Lucifer to escape to his own world with his grace diminished after some of it was used by Michael as a power source for the portal. From Lucifer, Castiel learns of Michael's impending invasion and warns the Winchesters while Asmodeus, the current ruler of Hell, learns of it as well and begins preparing by getting the Archangel Blade, the only weapon that can kill an archangel such as Michael or Lucifer. An attempt by the Winchesters to open another door between the worlds leads to Michael capturing the Nephilim Jack, the one being powerful enough to open the door for him. Jack eventually escapes with Mary Winchester and an attempt by Zachariah to recapture him leads to Zachariah's death. Seeing the state of Apocalypse World, Mary and Jack form a resistance against Michael with the intention of killing him to save both worlds. As the war continues, Michael compels the Prophet Kevin Tran to commit a suicide bombing against the resistance in a somewhat successful effort to break Jack's spirit by showing Jack that he cannot save everyone.

In the penultimate episode of Season 13 "Exodus", the Winchesters return to Apocalypse World with Lucifer and Gabriel in an effort to finally rescue Mary and Jack. With Mary unwilling to leave the people behind, the Winchesters lead an exodus through the rift back to their universe. However, Michael himself interrupts the exodus, hoping to preventing their escape and use the rift to reach their world. Though surprised to see Gabriel, Michael does not hesitate to engage his younger brother, quickly overpowering Gabriel and killing him with an Archangel Blade. Gabriel's sacrifice enables the Winchesters to escape, leaving Michael stuck in Apocalypse World with Lucifer when the rift closes moments before Michael can reach it. Lucifer subsequently offers Michael a deal where he will share the spell to reopen the rift and in exchange, he and Michael will travel to the Winchesters' world together where Lucifer will get his son and Michael will get the chance to conquer everything else.

In the Season 13 finale "Let the Good Times Roll", Michael unexpectedly attacks the Winchesters in a gas station near their bunker, having arrived in their world with Lucifer. Dean manages to hold Michael at bay long enough to escape with holy fire, but Michael soon breaks free and attacks the Winchesters' bunker, easily defeating all resistance and preparing to kill Dean. Sam is able to summon Jack for help through a prayer and Jack attacks Michael, seriously injuring him. Before Jack can kill Michael, Lucifer's evil deeds are revealed to his son and Lucifer steals Jack's grace and departs with Jack and Sam. In the aftermath, a weakened Michael warns Dean and Castiel that Lucifer is now "super-charged" and can destroy the universe if he wishes. While Michael once had the power to stop him, he is now too weak to do so, particularly in his injured state with a battered vessel. Desperate to stop Lucifer, Dean remembers that he is the Michael Sword, Michael's one true vessel with whom Michael will be more powerful than ever. With Michael acknowledging that by working together, he and Dean would have a chance against Lucifer, Dean offers Michael a deal where he will become Michael's vessel to fight Lucifer, but Dean will remain in control while Michael powers him. Michael consents to the deal and gains Dean as his vessel. With Michael powering him from within, Dean gains access to the archangel's teleportation, strength, invulnerability and flight capabilities, allowing him to fight Lucifer on a more even level and ultimately kill him with Michael's Archangel Blade. With Lucifer dead, Michael betrays his deal with Dean, takes full control of his body and departs, loose upon the Winchesters' world in his true vessel.

In Season 14's "Stranger in a Strange Land," three weeks after possessing Dean, Michael travels around asking various people and beings "what do you want?" while trying to figure out the answer in regards to himself. In the end, Michael decides to form an alliance with monsters, seeing them as pure as all they want to do is feed.

In "Gods and Monsters," Michael performs experiments using angel grace to enhance the powers of monsters. After several misfires, Michael perfects his methods and begins building an army of enhanced monsters loyal to him by making a deal with a werewolf pack leader. During this time, Dean manages to briefly surface in a mirror and attempts to order Michael out of his body to no luck. Michael baits a trap for Sam, Mary and Bobby Singer using a vampire he had purposefully let escape. Michael's enhanced werewolves, who are immune to silver, attack the hunters, who are caught off-guard but manage to kill the monsters through decapitation. Moments later, Dean arrives, himself once more and with Michael mysteriously gone from his body. Dean tells the others that Michael left his body on his own and he has no idea why the archangel left him.

In "The Scar," Dean has Castiel go through his memory in hopes of learning what happened to Michael after finding a mysterious scar upon his arm. Castiel is able to locate a memory of Michael getting stabbed in the arm with the spear of the Kaia Nieves from the alternate reality known as the Bad Place. Sam, Dean and Jody Mills track down Kaia who is being hunted by Michael's enhanced vampires. During a confrontation with Kaia, Dean remembers Michael attempting to make a deal with Kaia who refused and attacked him with the spear, which is capable of harming and possibly killing Michael. Following an attack by three more of Michael's monsters, Kaia departs with the spear despite the fact that Michael will never stop hunting her as long as she has it. Dean tells Sam afterwards that being possessed by Michael was like drowning to him and he blames himself for Michael's rampage.

In "Nightmare Logic," the Winchesters and Bobby face a djinn whose powers have been enhanced by Michael. The djinn explains that Michael, while still in Dean's body, had ordered him to set himself up someplace quiet and act as a trap for hunters. Before Dean kills him. the djinn warns that Michael has dozens of similar traps all over for hunters. Afterwards, the Winchesters spread the word to other hunters to be on the lookout for Michael's monster traps.

In "Nihilism," Sam and Castiel manage to trap Michael using a combination of a holy fire cocktail and the angel cuffs. However, Michael simply summons monsters to rescue him. Trapped, Sam attempts to get help from the Reaper Violet who refuses until the group is suddenly teleported to the Bunker. Michael is chained to a post but summons his army to rescue him and works to instill doubts in Jack and Castiel over Dean's relationship with them. Michael reveals that after learning about God from Dean's mind, he has come to believe that God considers both worlds "failed drafts" and has left to start again. Michael states that he intends to destroy all of the worlds he can until he finds God and kills him too. In an attempt to stop Michael, Sam and Castiel use the British Men of Letters mind-link device to enter Dean's mind to try to get him to throw Michael out, locating Dean in a world Michael has created for him where Dean is perfectly happy. After Dean is reminded of the truth, Michael appears in the bar and taunts Dean over him supposedly seeing Sam and Castiel as burdens. However, they realize that Michael is just stalling and is powerless in Dean's mind. Despite this, Michael retains his superior fighting skills and warns that Dean will be burnt out if he kicked out of Dean's body. In response, the three team up together to trap Michael in the bar cooler, effectively trapping Michael in Dean's mind. Though Dean intends to be Michael's cage, he continues to work to break free while his army disbands without Michael able to control them. Billie later visits Dean and warns him that all versions of Dean's fate but one has Michael escaping and using Dean's body to destroy the world. Billie shows Dean the single fate where Michael loses, shocking him at what it reveals must be done. In "Damaged Goods," Dean reveals that it is to lock himself in a magical box, a prison impenetrable even to an archangel, and imprison them both at the bottom of the ocean. However, Sam and Castiel talk him out of the plan in "Prophet and Loss."

In "Ouroboros," Dean is knocked unconscious by a Gorgon during a hunt, allowing Michael to escape from his prison. Rather than possessing Dean again, Michael seeks revenge on him and his family for humiliating him. He leaves Dean's body and forces the witch Rowena MacLeod to say "yes" and slaughters several hunters. Michael gloats to the Winchesters and Castiel, whom he tortures, until Jack taps into the power of his soul to face off with Michael. Jack is able to exorcise Michael from Rowena and causes the swirling cloud of light that Michael becomes to burn up, as he deems that he will not hurt anyone again. Jack then takes to absorbing Michael's grace in the process. Jack announces to the others that Michael is dead, and his grace has fully restored Jack's powers. However, it is later revealed that killing Michael burned away Jack's soul, leaving him completely soulless.

In Season 15's "Our Father, Who Aren't In Heaven," Castiel shows the Michael of the Winchesters' world some of his memories of this Michael amongst other things while trying to convince him of God's betrayal. Michael is completely disillusioned after this, particularly as he now knows that he is not the only Michael.

Naomi
Naomi, portrayed by Amanda Tapping, is a "cool", "mysterious", and "polished" villain affiliated with a previously unknown faction of angels, eventually revealed to be "Heaven's intelligence division," a group tasked with secretly brainwashing angels and altering their memories to keep them both in-line with Heaven's orders and oblivious to the truth of their actions and goals. When Naomi was being cast, the character was compared to The Good Shepherds antihero Edward Wilson, Sr. (Matt Damon), in that she is "willing to sacrifice everything for the greater good." In his 2014 revision of The Essential Supernatural: On the Road with Sam and Dean Winchester, Nicholas Knight described her as "a powerful angel...ruthless in her quest to prevent the angel tablet from falling into the wrong hands". Despite her role as an antagonist, Knight noted that Naomi "quickly became one of the most enigmatic and popular new characters of the (eighth) season."

Naomi first appears at the end of the episode "A Little Slice of Kevin", where she claims responsibility for Castiel's mysterious return from Purgatory though he cannot remember her and demonstrates her complete control over his actions by command. Although she tells him off-screen that she is the current ruler of Heaven, Metatron later claims that she is only one of many faction leaders at war with each other. In "Torn and Frayed", Naomi tasks Castiel with rescuing Samandriel after she gets a distress call from the latter when he is under torture from Crowley. Upon learning that Samandriel has revealed the existence of the angel Word of God tablet to Crowley, however, she forces Castiel to kill the other angel, which she justifies by emphasizing the tablet's importance and that any angel would die to protect it, calling Samandriel a traitor for divulging information about it. Prior to his death, Samandriel had been trying to tell Castiel something about Naomi, triggering a memory of Castiel's in which Naomi was approaching his eye with a mysterious instrument resembling a drill while he was restrained and screaming. Noticing Castiel's strange actions and behavior, the Winchesters become suspicious that Castiel is being controlled. "Goodbye Stranger" opens with the revelation that Naomi has been working on fully indoctrinating Castiel to her control and determines him to be "ready" once he kills thousands of copies of Dean. She then sends him to get the angel tablet before Crowley can. After he finds the tablet and she orders him to kill Dean, Castiel manages to fight her control and eventually breaks it by touching the tablet. He tells Dean about her before going into hiding to protect the tablet. In an encounter with Crowley, Naomi says that Castiel is doing what he is meant to do: protect the tablet, even if it means protecting it from her. She is later shown to be searching for Castiel to find the tablet.

In "Taxi Driver," Naomi meets with Dean to try to convince him that she is on his side, claiming that Castiel had misinformed him about her due to his mental instability, and that she wants to help Castiel; Dean does not believe her. Nonetheless, Naomi tips him off to the danger Sam is in and later saves Sam and Dean from Crowley, driving the demon off and helping the Winchesters complete the second trial to seal Hell by enabling a trapped Bobby's soul to ascend to Heaven. She reiterates that Dean can trust her and that they all share the goal of sealing Hell. Naomi and her angels eventually slaughter the patrons of a restaurant they know Castiel is passing through and leave one alive but traumatized in order to make him stop long enough for them to capture him; Naomi kills the survivor afterward, rejecting Castiel's angry reminder that they (angels) are supposed to guard humans. She interrogates Castiel about the location of the tablet and reveals that she has been altering and erasing his memories for longer than believed, complaining that he has never functioned as he was supposed to. She flees when Crowley attacks her men and fires at her with a gun loaded with melted-down angel blades. In the Season 8 finale, Naomi learns that Metatron is working with Castiel, prompting her to capture the rogue angel and use her drill-like instrument to access his thoughts and learn his plans; when she finds out what they are, she is horrified and immediately warns Dean and Castiel, revealing that Metatron is not trying to close the gates of Heaven, but rather trying to permanently expel all angels in revenge for having himself had to flee to escape her and the archangels, who had ordered her to detain him and take the knowledge he had as the Scribe of God after God left Heaven. Naomi expresses remorse for her actions and that of the other angels, saying that angels are meant to protect humanity and they have lost sight of that somewhere along the way. To begin making amends, she warns Dean that if Sam completes the trials, he will die, and then offers to hear Castiel out if he truly wishes to return to Heaven. As they cannot confirm her claims, Castiel refuses to believe her, though Dean does and ultimately stops Sam from completing the trials. Naomi is later found collapsed on her desk in her "office" in Heaven, Metatron having gotten free and stabbed her in the head with her own drill off-screen. Metatron taunts Castiel that she had been telling the truth, and then completes his plan. Naomi is confirmed dead through dialogue in the episode "I'm No Angel" in Season 9.

In Season 13's "Funeralia", Castiel returns to Heaven for help on finding the still living Gabriel and fighting the invading Alternate Michael, only to find Naomi alive. Naomi explains that she survived Metatron's attack, but her injuries were such that she had the word spread that she was dead. Even after nearly five years to put her thoughts back together in her skull as she puts it, Naomi is still only "mostly here." However, her presence is needed since there are now less than a dozen angels left alive, Naomi and Castiel included. Displaying a vastly different personality, Naomi explains to Castiel that the surviving angels will soon burn out and Heaven will crumble if something does not change. As a result, the angels cannot leave Heaven without risking this happening. The angels only chance is for Gabriel to return as his power can stabilize Heaven. If he cannot be found, when Heaven crumbles, all of the souls will be released upon the Earth as ghosts. Now allies, Naomi accompanies Castiel back to Earth and promises that the remaining angels will keep Heaven going for as long as they can if he cannot find Gabriel, but expresses a belief that maybe the situation cannot be fixed. As she returns to Heaven, Naomi seals the portal behind her until the situation is resolved one way or another.

During the Season 14's "Byzantium", she appears again where she meets Castiel and Dumah in Jack's Heaven after he dies and ascends. She explains to Castiel that Jack left and a threat is invading Heaven while defeating the angels. Naomi elaborates on it being The Shadow (the entity that rules The Empty) and reveals that she knows Castiel meeting it since he is the only angel to ever escape the realm. Naomi states The Shadow wants Jack because it believes he belongs in its domain, she considered giving into its demands since Heaven would crumble if they did not. When Castiel refused, she tried to plead to her brother but The Shadow possessed her and she implored to her siblings to run. Later on, Naomi meets Castiel again after he made a deal with The Shadow and left. She is seen unharmed from the attack and thanks him for his role even if he did not do it for Heaven. As a reward, she tells Castiel the location of Alternate Michael.

In "Absence," Castiel attempts to contact Naomi, but gets Dumah instead who claims that Naomi is unavailable. In "Jack in the Box," Castiel returns to Heaven where Dumah reveals that she overthrew Naomi following the Shadow's invasion of Heaven and has locked Naomi in a very small cell. Dumah begins manipulating Jack to solidify her own power and establish a reign of terror but is killed by Castiel when she threatens the shared Heaven of John and Mary Winchester. Following Dumah's death, it is unclear if Naomi regained control of Heaven again.

Raphael
Raphael is the archangel assigned to protecting Chuck Shurley. Raphael appears to protect Chuck twice, in "The Monster at the End of the Book", when he is in the presence of Lilith, and in "Lucifer Rising", where he kills Castiel as he and Dean attempt to prevent Lucifer's rise. He is summoned and subsequently trapped by Dean and a resurrected Castiel in an episode from Season 5 "Free to Be Me and You", but refuses to cooperate when they demand to know the location of God, only saying that he believes that God is dead. Dean and Castiel leave Raphael trapped despite his threat to hunt Castiel down when he escapes. In this episode, Raphael appears for the first time in a bodily vessel and is played by actor Demore Barnes, who reprises the role in "The Third Man" and "The Man Who Would Be King". Following the prevention of the Apocalypse, Raphael and his supporters are at war with Castiel and his followers over Castiel's opposition to Raphael's plan to free Lucifer and Michael to restart the Apocalypse. He makes his second on-screen appearance in a Season 6 episode "The Third Man", in which he and his soldiers are in close pursuit of Castiel. Raphael overpowers Castiel and is about to kill him when Balthazar intervenes and irrevocably destroys Raphael's vessel with one of Heaven's weapons, saving Castiel's life. Raphael is forced to search for a new vessel, eventually possessing a woman played by Lanette Ware. In "The French Mistake", he sends the angel hitman Virgil after Castiel's allies, including the Winchesters. Balthazar transports the brothers to an alternate universe with a key to where Heaven's weapons are stored and Virgil follows. This is revealed to have been a ploy by Balthazar and Castiel, allowing the latter time to retrieve the weapons. Now equipped with the weapons, Castiel forces Raphael to flee when the latter is poised to kill a returned Sam and Dean. Flashbacks in "The Man Who Would Be King" depicts the background to Raphael's war with Castiel; Raphael believed that the Apocalypse was destined to happen and informed Castiel of his intention to release Lucifer and Michael from the cage, giving Castiel the ultimatum to submit or die. Having forged a deal with the demon Crowley, Castiel attacked Raphael and declared war in Heaven. In the Season 6 finale, "The Man Who Knew Too Much", Castiel reneges on his deal with Crowley, who turns to Raphael. Crowley agrees to open Purgatory for Raphael in exchange for his safety. However, their ritual fails whilst Castiel opens Purgatory for himself. Castiel appears, now more powerful than ever, and obliterates Raphael with a snap of his fingers. In "We Happy Few", when discussing how they will defeat the Darkness, God tells the Winchesters that he cannot resurrect Raphael or Gabriel as they are beings of primordial creation and will take too long to bring back.

Samandriel
Samandriel, called Alfie' for short, portrayed by Tyler Johnston, is an angel who seems to hold humanity in higher regard than most angels and appears to hold Castiel in great regard as well. He appears at Plutus' auction in "What's Up, Tiger Mommy?" to bid for the demon Word of God tablet, taking the vessel of a young man named Alfie. He asks Dean about Castiel and is noticeably saddened that Castiel did not make it out of Purgatory. Samandriel indicates that he supports Castiel and tells Dean that he thinks Castiel's problem is he has too much heart. Samandriel bids for the Word of God, but loses. After Mrs. Tran wins by bidding her soul, Samandriel approaches her to offer angelic protection to Kevin, but she refuses which he respects. In "A Little Slice of Kevin," Samandriel has been captured by Crowley who tortures him for the names of all future Prophets with an angel sword. Samandriel breaks under the torture and tells him all the names, but Crowley is not satisfied until Samandriel reveals that the next generation of Prophets have not been born yet and thus there are no more. Crowley stops the torture without urgency and orders Samandriel put "on ice" for future torture, believing he can get more out of him. In "Torn and Frayed," Samandriel manages to push a spike out of his head that is blocking his connection to the other angels and sends a distress signal to Naomi. However, the demon Viggor discovers him and replaces the spike and starts torturing him again using headgear that puts a lot of spikes into Samandriel's head. The spikes cause Samandriel to revert to "factory settings" and he starts speaking in Enochian, in his distress speaking through a bush that catches fire. Viggor summons Crowley who tortures Samandriel personally to see what he can get from him when he is at "factory settings." As Sam, Dean and Castiel launch a rescue, Samandriel starts talking about the Word of God tablets and just before they manage to break into the room, Samandriel reveals that there is an angel tablet. As Sam and Dean kill Viggor and another demon, Castiel removes the headgear from Samandriel, returning him to normal and takes him outside. Fearful of what he has revealed, Samandriel begs Castiel not to take him back to Heaven and warns Castiel that "they" are controlling them both. Before Samandriel can elaborate, Naomi orders Castiel to kill him for being a traitor. With no other choice, Castiel stabs Samandriel with his angel sword, killing him. Naomi has Castiel take Samandriel's body to Heaven so she can determine just how much he broke and explains that he is a traitor as he revealed the existence of the angel tablet which any angel would die to protect as it could cause great harm if it fell into demon hands.

Tessa
Tessa is a reaper who guides the deceased to the afterlife. She is portrayed by Lindsey McKeon. Following the car accident in the first-season finale, Dean is critically wounded, and his soul leaves his body. Dean attempts to save other souls and defends himself from a reaper. The reaper then returns in the form of Tessa, posing as a coma patient. She attempts to convince Dean to move on but, as he considers this, Azazel intervenes as part of his deal with John Winchester and possesses Tessa to restore Dean to life, although Dean remembers none of this. In the Season 4 episode "Death Takes a Holiday", she continues the work of a local reaper who has gone missing. After restoring Dean's memories of her with a kiss, she assists the brothers and agrees not to reap the souls for the duration. She is kidnapped by Alastair as part of a ritual to unlock a seal, but Dean and Sam rescue her. After getting Dean to help her have a young boy named Cole move on from being a ghost, she warns Dean that the angels are not looking for his best interest and to trust his own instincts. In "Appointment in Samarra", Dean summons Tessa during an out-of-body experience and asks her to call Death. Although she refuses, Death arrives on his own accord. Subsequently, Tessa guides Dean in his role as Death for 24 hours as part of a wager made with the Horseman in order to retrieve Sam's soul. Tessa returns in "Stairway to Heaven" where she is a part of Castiel's faction to retake Heaven. She has grown depressed over the fact that she can no longer ferry souls to Heaven due to it being closed and that she can hear their cries for help and is brainwashed by Metatron into acting as a suicide bomber for him, supposedly under Castiel's instruction in order to unite all the angels under his command. Tessa is found and captured by Dean before she can do this and her "bomb" is defused. Dean questions Tessa who, under her brainwashing, insists she is doing it for Castiel. When Dean pulls the First Blade on her, Tessa commits suicide by impaling herself on the Blade while Dean is holding it, thanking him at the same time. Her method of suicide makes it appear that Dean murdered her and helps turn Castiel's followers against him.

Uriel

Zachariah

References

 
Lists of American drama television series characters
Lists of action television characters
Lists of fantasy television characters
Angels in television
Fiction about purgatory